= Church of St Catherine, Montacute =

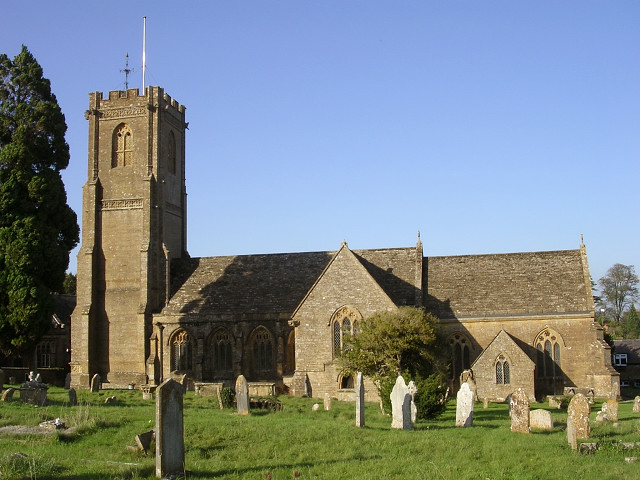

- Location within Somerset
- 50°56′59″N 2°43′04″W
- OS grid reference: ST 49673 16952
- Location: Montacute, Somerset
- Country: England
- Denomination: Church of England

History
- Status: Active
- Dedication: St Catherine of Alexandria

Architecture
- Functional status: Parish Church
- Heritage designation: Grade II*
- Designated: 19 April 1961
- Years built: 12th century

Administration
- Province: Province of Canterbury
- Diocese: Diocese of Bath and Wells
- Archdeaconry: Archdeaconry of Wells
- Deanery: Deanery of Yeovil
- Parish: Parish of Montacute

The Anglican Church of St Catherine at Montacute within the English county of Somerset was first built in the 12th century. It is a Grade II* listed building.

Montacute has had religious significance since the discover of a stone crucifix in 1035. St Catherine's was built in association with the Cluniac Montacute Priory becoming the parish church after the Dissolution of the Monasteries. Much of the fabric of the current church is from its extension in the 13th century and the tower is from the 15th. It was restored in the Victorian period. The church has tombs and memorials to the Phelips family, of Montacute House.

== History ==
It is not known when the first church was built on the site, however it was before 1035 when a black crucifix or Holy Rood was discovered within the grounds of the manor owned by Tofig. He loaded the life-sized cross onto a cart, and he then named a series of possible destinations owned by him. The oxen pulling the wagon (six red and six white in one version of the tale) refused to move until he said Waltham in Essex, where Tofig already had a hunting lodge. They then started, and continued non-stop until they reached Waltham, and where they stopped Tofig decided to build an abbey at the site – this became Waltham Abbey. In the meantime, Tofig rebuilt the church at Waltham to house the cross, on which he bestowed his own sword, and his second wife Gytha (or Glitha), the daughter of Osgod Clapa, adorned the figure with a crown, bands of gold and precious stones. The cross became the object of pilgrimage, notably by Harold Godwinson. It was at Tofig's wedding at Lambeth on 8 June 1042 that King Harthacnut suddenly died of a convulsion "while standing at his drink". "Holy Cross" became the battle-cry of Harold's armies at the battles of Stamford Bridge and Hastings. The Holy Rood is said to have foretold Harold's defeat at Hastings: on the way there from the Battle of Stamford Bridge he stopped off at Waltham Abbey to pray, and the legend is that the cross "bowed down" off the wall as he did so, taken as a portent of doom.

Around 1100 a church dedicated to St Peter had been built in association with Montacute Priory, by 1200 a chapel dedicated to St Catherine had been added next to the monks burial ground. Montacute Priory was a Cluniac priory of the Benedictine order. It was founded between 1078 and 1102 by William, Count of Mortain, in face of a threat that if he did not do so, the King would take the land from him. It was the only Somerset dependency of Cluny Abbey until 1407, when it gained independence from France. It was dissolved in 1539, though there was a short restoration under the Catholic Queen Mary. At its height in 1262 there were 25 monks. In 1539 there were a Prior and 16 monks. There are extensive earthworks to the south of St Catherine's Church which may be the claustral range, and a fishpond. Village oral tradition has it that an earlier church, presumably St Peter's, was destroyed in a fire. There is little evidence of this, though fire-reddened carved stonework, said to be from this church was reused in the lower courses of the rear of the village school kitchen. (This is in private hands and not visible to the public). A few other pieces of burnt stone are in other village buildings, though none carved.

In the 1830s conflict between the vicar, Reverend Albion Cox, and the church bell ringers about the ringing of the bells for a local secular feast day lead to rioting and arrests.

The vicar of Montacute between 1885 and 1918 was the Reverend Charles Francis Powys (1843–1923), father of the writers John Cowper Powys, Llewelyn Powys and Theodore Francis Powys. Philippa Powys, their sister, and another author, was born in Montacute.

== Architecture ==
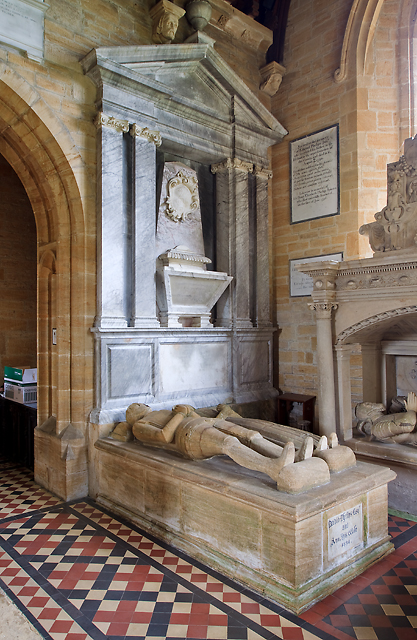
Marble monument to Edward Phelips

The only fabric surviving from the church of 1170 is the Norman chancel arch. The rest of the church was altered in the 13th with the construction of the present chancel, transepts and north porch. The four bay nave was built in the 15th century and includes Perpendicular traceried windows.

The three stage square tower, which is supported by corner buttresses is from the 15th century. The peal of six bells in the tower range in age from the early 17th to 20th century. They were rehung in 1948. The clock face was added in 1815.

Extensive Victorian restoration was undertaken in 1870 by Henry Hall. This included the addition of a vestry onto the south side of the chancel. The organ was moved to its current position over the porch from the base of the tower.

The churchyard, which now extends into the area once part of the priory, contains the remains of a 15th-century cross, and multiple monuments.

== Interior ==
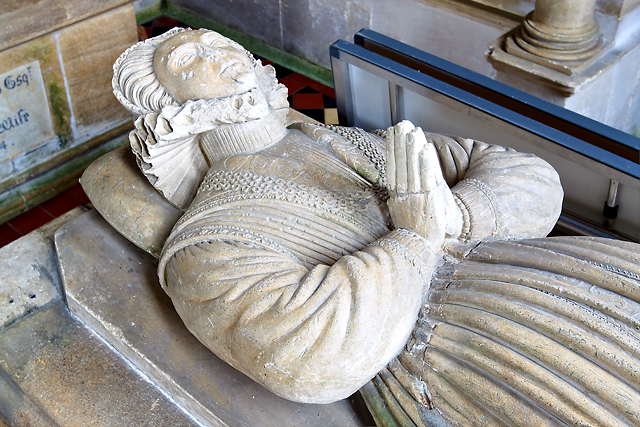
Monument to Bridget Phelips

The north transept of the church contains monuments to the Phelips family, of Montacute House, including David and Ann, who died in 1484, and Bridget, who died 1508. There are canopied effigies of Thomas, died 1588, and Elizabeth, died 1598. On the west wall is a marble monument to Edward, who died in 1680.

An Anglo-Saxon Hamstone font lay unidentified in the churchyard for many years, but has now been reinstated replacing its Tudor successor. The majority of the interior decoration is from the Victorian restoration.

== Parish ==
The parish is part of the benefice of Odcombe, Brympton, Lufton and Montacute within the Diocese of Bath and Wells.

== See also ==
- List of ecclesiastical parishes in the Diocese of Bath and Wells
