= Marian Powys =

1669–1670 painting by Johannes Vermeer

The Lacemaker
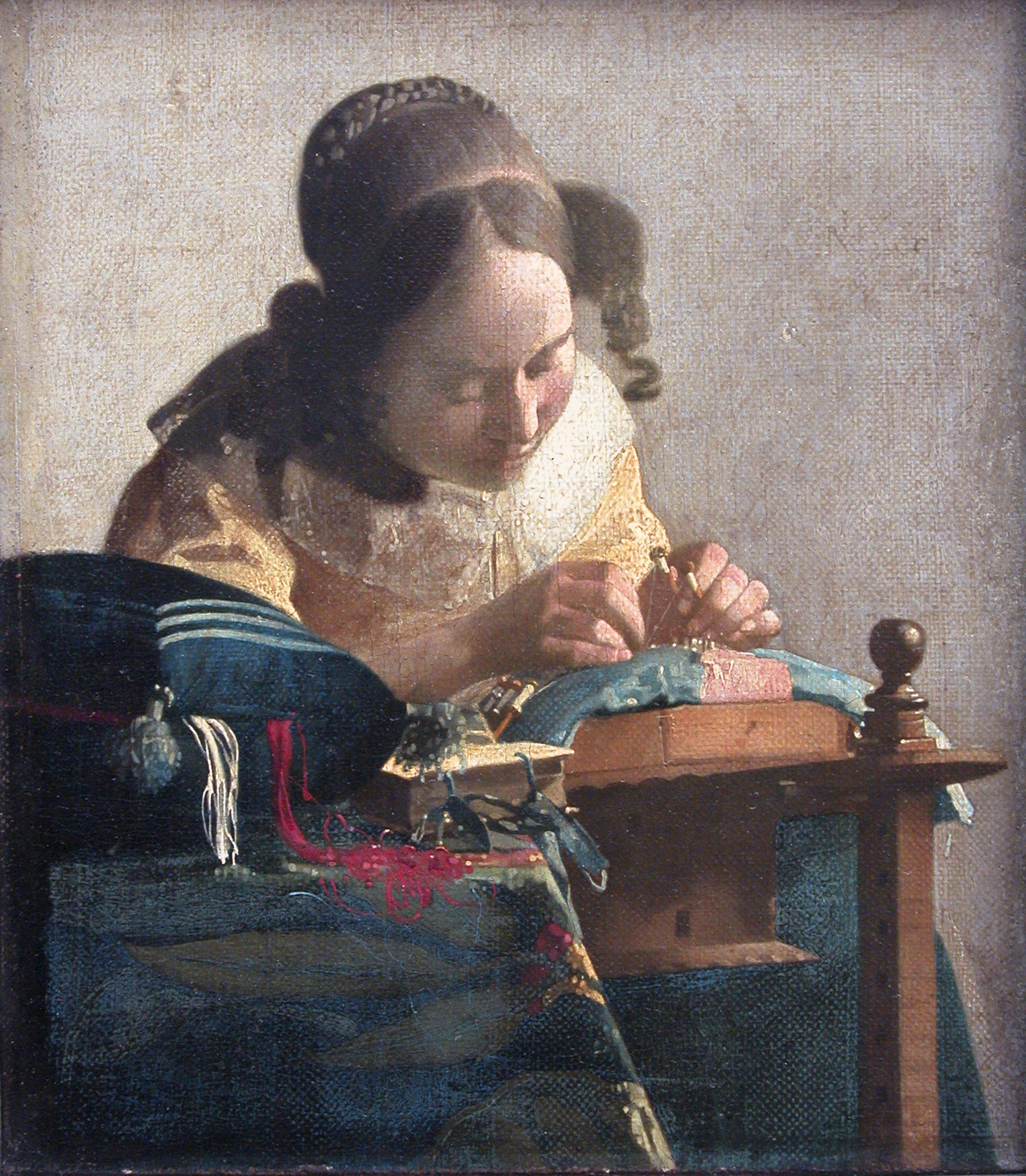
- Artist: Johannes Vermeer
- Year: c. 1669–1670

Emily Marian 'May' Powys (Mrs Powys Grey) 27 October 1882 - 1 Mar 1972, was a British-born lace maker, designer, dealer, teacher, consultant, and author who worked mainly in the United States. She was known for her expertise in handmade lace, founded the Devonshire Lace Shop in New York in 1916, advised museums and legal cases, and published Lace and Lace Making in 1953. Born in Dorset, England, Powys studied art and lace making before settling in New York in 1913, with her brother John Cowper Powys. After early office work, she opened her the Devonshire Lace Shop on Washington Square in 1916, and established herself professionally through her teaching, collecting, consulting, and writing. She became an American citizen in 1941.

== Biography ==
=== Early life and education ===
Marian Powys was born in Fordington, Dorset (part of Dorchester) (where the Powyses lived briefly) in 1882, before moving to Montacute, Somerset, the daughter of the Reverend Charles Francis Powys (1843–1923). and Mary Cowper Johnson. She came from a talented family of eleven children. Her siblings included John Cowper Powys, Llewelyn Powys, Theodore Francis Powys, Philippa Powys, Gertrude Mary Powys, and A. R. Powys.

Marian was fist introduced to the world of lace by her mother's cousin, Lady Philippa Mary Shirley.

She attended Norwich High School for Girls (staying with her aunt Theodora Johnson) and then in 1898 studied art at the Yeovil School of Art and Science with her sister Gertrude. In 1908 and 1909 she studied lace making at the Yeovil School of Art and Science and then taught Honiton lace making there. During 1910 she was teaching in Yeovil and then at the Newquay School of lace making Marian Powys was working in 1911 as a lace maker and designer at the Chudleigh Lace School, Newquay, Cornwall. Then in December 1911 she travelled to New York to visit her brother John, a writer and extension lecturer, who lived part of the year in America. Marian Powys also travelled through Europe studying lace and lace making, in Belgium, France, Italy, Switzerland and 6 months in Hanover, Germany.

=== Career in New York ===
Marian Powys returned to New York in December 1913 and stayed. Her mother commented, in a letter dated 7 July 1914, to her daughter Lucy that that Powys had passed a shorthand examination and entered her name with an employment bureau. Initially she worked as secretary to the wealthy, German-born American businessman man and philanthropist August Heckscher. In 1915 she won a gold medal at the Panama-Pacific Exposition in San Francisco, California Then, in 1916 she opened the, Devonshire Lace Shop at 60 Washington Square, New York, with the financial help of novelist Theodore Dreiser, who was a friend of her brother John, and August Heckscher. Through the shop and related work, Powys developed a reputation as a specialist in handmade lace. She maintained a lace business in New York until 1945, lectured and taught, worked with the Brooklyn Institute of Arts and Sciences, advised museums, and provided expert advice in legal cases. Her clients included Eleanor Roosevelt, Katharine Hepburn, Isadora Duncan, the Vatican, European royalty, and wealthy American families. She also continued to teach lace making.

Marian Powys had a son, Peter Powys Grey, born 24 June 1922, the child of an affair with Ernest Angell (1889 – 1973), who was an American lawyer, author and President of the American Civil Liberties Union, from 1950 to 1969. However, Marian, aided by her brother John, invented the story that his father was a Peter Grey, and that he had died soon after his son was born.

=== Later life and legacy ===
Powys closed the Devonshire Lace Shop in 1945, reportedly because of changing taste, but continued to work with lace. In 1946 she was appointed as a consultant to the Metropolitan Museum of Art. Powys published Lace and Lace Making in 1953.

In 1951 there was a display of lace from Marian Powys' collection organized by John Bernard Myers at the Tibor de Nagy Gallery of contemporary art in New York. The "deliciously outrageous" installation was designed by the abstract expressionist painter Alfred Leslie. Amongst those who attended was the painter Jackson Pollock, who "took great pleasure in the notion of art anonyme: the rhythms of swirl and cross stitch". On learning of this, Marian "said she admired the lovely skein pictures of Mr Pollock" and had "recommended new lace makers find inspiration in his splendid conceptions".

Aged 89, Emily Marian Powys died on 1 March 1972 at Snedens Landing, Palisades, Rockland, New York, USA. In 1982 there was a retrospective exhibition of lace from her collection at the University of Syracuse.

== Bibliography ==
- Lace and Lace Making. Boston: Charles T. Branford Company, 1953. Reprint edition with appreciation by Jo Bidner and Nancie Ann Balun and preface by Peter Powys Grey. Detroit: Gale Research Company, 1981.

Selected articles by Marian Powys

- "The Gossamer Trail of Lace", Fortune, 5 June 1932, pp. 56–61
- "Lace in America", Arts and Decoration 12, November 1919, pp. 20–21
- "The Work of the Lace Masters", Arts and Decoration 32, December 1929, pp. 72–73
- "A Gentleman's Lace", The Brooklyn Museum Quarterly 18, January 1931, pp. 1–4
- "Old Bridal Veils", American Collector 12, June 1943, pp. 10–11
- "Antique European Fans of Vellum, Paper, and Lace", American Collector 12, January 1944
- "Classic Masterpieces in Lace’", American Collector 13, December 1944, pp.8-9
- "Only a Skein of Thread", Interiors, February 1951, pp. 86–93
- "A Bestiary in Lace", The Bulletin of the Needle and Bobbin Club 47 (1963) pp. 57–67

=== Articles about Marian Powys ===
- Littleton C. Powys, The Powys Family (1952). Based on a lecture given by him to the Swansea and South Wales Bookmans Association, May 1945. Digital archive Old Shirburnian Society/Powys.
- Llewelyn Powys, "Miss Marian Powys, Artist and Lacemaker" (press release 1921). The Powys Newsletter no. 6, 1983, pp. 24–25.
- Peter P. Grey, "In These Delicate Constructions", American Craft (Aug.-Sept. 1981); pp. 51–56. Also, The Powys Society Newsletter No. 37, pp. 3–6,
- Elizabeth M. Kurella. "Keeping Lace Vibrantly Alive: A Tribute to Marian Powys". The Powys Society
- Elizabeth M. Kurella: a video lecture on Marian Powys
- June Burns Bové, "A Legacy in Lace"; which features photographs of Marian's personal handmade scrapbooks, is available as a PDF through the of Arizona's textile archive
- "Marian Powys (1982-1972): Powys web site created by Jaqueline Peltier
- 1982 Design in Lace. University of Syracuse
- Julie Lasky, "Marian Powys at Snedens". The Powys Journal, Vol. 34, 2024, pp. 12–38.
- Dorothy Davis, "A Memoir: Peter Powys Grey 1922-1992 and Marian Powys Grey 1882-1992". The Powys Society Newsletter, no. 37, pp. 7–9.
