= John Johnson (clergyman) =

John Johnson (15 November 1769 – 29 September 1833) was a Church of England clergyman, poet, and editor, a cousin and friend of William Cowper, who lived with Johnson in his declining years.

== Life ==
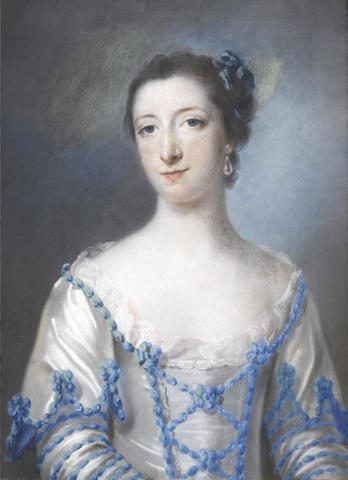
Lady Hesketh

Born at Ludham, Norfolk, Johnson was the son of John Johnson (born 1717), "a well-to-do gentleman", by his marriage to Catherine Dunne, whose father Roger Dunne, of Catfield, was the brother of William Cowper's mother. Johnson's mother was deeply disappointed to find herself marrying a prosperous older man as his third wife, having been in love with a young but poor Dunne cousin. Johnson was his father's only son. He was first educated at Holt Grammar School, then was tutored by a clergyman called Reeve at Bungay and another called Buck near Saffron Walden. In 1788 he matriculated at Gonville and Caius College, Cambridge, having gained a scholarship the year before.

In 1789 Johnson wrote a poem called Audley End and first visited Cowper at Weston Underwood, Buckinghamshire, where he became a frequent visitor. He took the degree of Bachelor of Laws in 1794 and was advanced to Doctor of Laws in 1803.

Johnson was ordained a deacon and priest in 1793 and after leaving Cambridge became a curate at Dereham, living there with his sister Catharine (1767–1820). In the same year he was appointed as Chaplain to the Earl of Peterborough and Vicar of Hempnall. However, when Cowper's close friend Mary Unwin became paralysed, needing constant attention, Johnson moved her and Cowper to Norfolk and gave up his parish duties. Mrs Unwin died in December 1796, and Cowper became depressed and ill, remaining with the Johnsons until he died on 25 April 1800. After Cowper's death, Johnson had a long correspondence with another cousin of Cowper's, Harriett Hesketh, which was published in 1901.

In 1800, Johnson was appointed as Rector of Yaxham and Welborne, benefices he held until his death.

In 1808 Johnson married Maria Dorothea Livius, a daughter of George Livius, of Bedford, who had been Warren Hastings's Chief of Commissariat in British India. They had two daughters, Mary Theodora (born 1810) and Catharine Anne (born 1812), and three sons, William Cowper Johnson (born 1813), who became Rector of Yaxham in 1843, John Barham Johnson (born 1818), who became Rector of Welborne in 1845, and Henry Robert Vaughan Johnson (born 1820), who became a barrister. Their third son, H. R. V. Johnson, was Principal Secretary to Lord Chancellor Campbell, married his daughter Cecilia, and was appointed as one of the six Conveyancing Counsel in the Chancery Division of the High Court.

After the death of William Hayley in 1820, Johnson edited his unpublished papers, which in 1823 appeared in two volumes as The Memoirs of the Life and Writings of William Hayley Esq.

== Notable descendants ==
Johnson's granddaughter Mary Cowper Johnson married the Rev. C. F. Powys and was the mother of the philosopher John Cowper Powys (1872–1963), the writers Theodore Francis Powys (1875–1953), Llewelyn Powys (1884–1939), and Philippa Powys (1886–1963), and the architect Albert Powys (1881–1936).

== Publications ==
- John Johnson, LL.D., Sketch of the Life of Cowper (1815)
- John Johnson, LL.D., ed., The Memoirs of the Life and Writings of William Hayley Esq. the Friend and Biographer of Cowper, Written by Himself, With Extracts from His Private Correspondence and Unpublished Poetry (Henry Colburn and Company and Simpkin and Marshall, 2 volumes, 1823)
- Letters of Lady Hesketh to the Rev. John Johnson LL.D. concerning their Kinsman William Cowper the Poet (London: Jarrold and Sons, 1901)
