= Montacute =

Village and civil parish in Somerset, England

Coordinates: 50.95°N 2.72°W

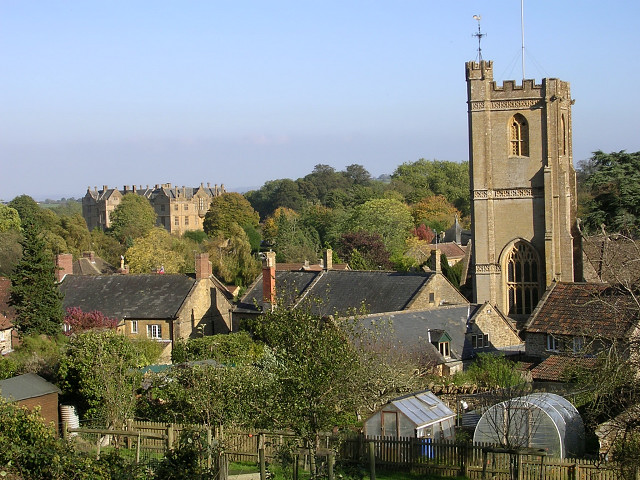
- Montacute showing the tower of the Church of St. Catherine

- Location within Somerset
- Population: 831
- OS grid reference: ST4916
- Unitary authority: Somerset Council
- Ceremonial county: Somerset
- Region: South West
- Country: England
- Sovereign state: United Kingdom
- Post town: MONTACUTE
- Postcode district: TA15
- Dialling code: 01935
- Police: Avon and Somerset
- Fire: Devon and Somerset
- Ambulance: South Western
- UK Parliament: Glastonbury and Somerton

Montacute is a village and civil parish in Somerset, England, 4 miles (6.4 km) west of Yeovil. The village has a population of 831 (2011 census). The name Montacute is thought by some to derive from the Latin "Mons Acutus", referring to the conically acute St Michael's Hill dominating the village to the west. An alternative view is that it is named after Drogo de Montagu, whose family originated from Montaigu-les-Bois, in the arrondissement of Coutances. Robert, Count of Mortain held Montacute after 1066, and Drogo was a close associate of his.

The village is built almost entirely of the local hamstone. From the 15th century until the beginning of the 20th century it formed the heart of the estate of the Phelips family of Montacute House. The village has a fine medieval church, and was the site of a Cluniac priory, the gatehouse of which is now a private house.

At the centre of the village is a large square known as the 'Borough' around which are grouped picturesque cottages and a pub, the Phelips Arms; there is a second public house and hotel situated in the village, called the King's Arms.

== Nomenclature ==
The village takes its name from St Michael's Hill, the conical hill overlooking the village from the Southwest. The hill became known at some time before 1086 by the Latin name of Mons Acutus, meaning "Sharp Mountain", being referred to in the Domesday Book of 1086 as "Montagud", within the manor of Biscopestone (Bishopstone): Ipse Comes (Moriton) tenet in dominio Biscopestone et ibi est castellum eius quod vocatur Montagud. ("The Count of Mortain himself holds Bishopstone in demesne and there is his castle which is called Montagud"). One of the Count's tenants at Biscopestone is named in the Domesday Book as "Drogo", believed to be Drogo (Drew) de Montagu, the earliest English-resident ancestor of the prominent Anglo-Norman de Montagu family (also known as "Montague" and "Montacute"), later Earls of Salisbury, which came over from Normandy with William the Conqueror. The de Montagu family held various manors in Somerset, including Shepton Montague (14 miles N-E of Montacute) and Bishopston, situated 300 metres to the south-east of the summit of the hill. Bishopston later became the site of Montacute Priory, and the village and parish of Montacute developed around it. The de Montagu family is believed to have taken its surname from its manor of origin in Normandy, now Montaigu-les-Bois, in the arrondissement of Coutances, which remained in the possession of the French branch of the family until the death of Sebastien de Montaigu in 1715, without children. According to the Duchess of Cleveland (Battle Abbey Roll, 1889): "(Drogo de Montaigu) had come to England in the train of the Earl of Mortain, and received from him large grants of lands, with the custody of the castle, built either by the Earl or his son William, in the manor of Bishopston, and styled, from its position on a sharp-topped hill, Monte Acuto" (sic, Mons Acutus). The French spelling "Mont-Aigu" means "sharp mountain", and the family's name was Latinised as de Monte Acuto (ablative form of Mons Acutus - "from the Sharp Mountain"). Authorities are not agreed as to whether the family was named after the hill in Bishopston, or whether the hill, village, parish and priory, were named after the family, thus ultimately after Montaigu-les-Bois in Normandy.

== History ==
To the west of the village is the Iron Age hill fort of Ham Hill, a large tribal fort of the Durotriges. The fort was conquered by the Roman Legio II Augusta sometime around 45 AD. The Romans briefly occupied the fort, then moved to a more permanent garrison at nearby Ilchester (Lindinis), and constructed the Fosse Way Roman road a few miles west of the village. A Roman villa was excavated near Batemoor Barn early in the 20th century and an extensive mosaic documented. Never adequately protected, this has probably been damaged by deep ploughing and sludge injection in the last 40 years.

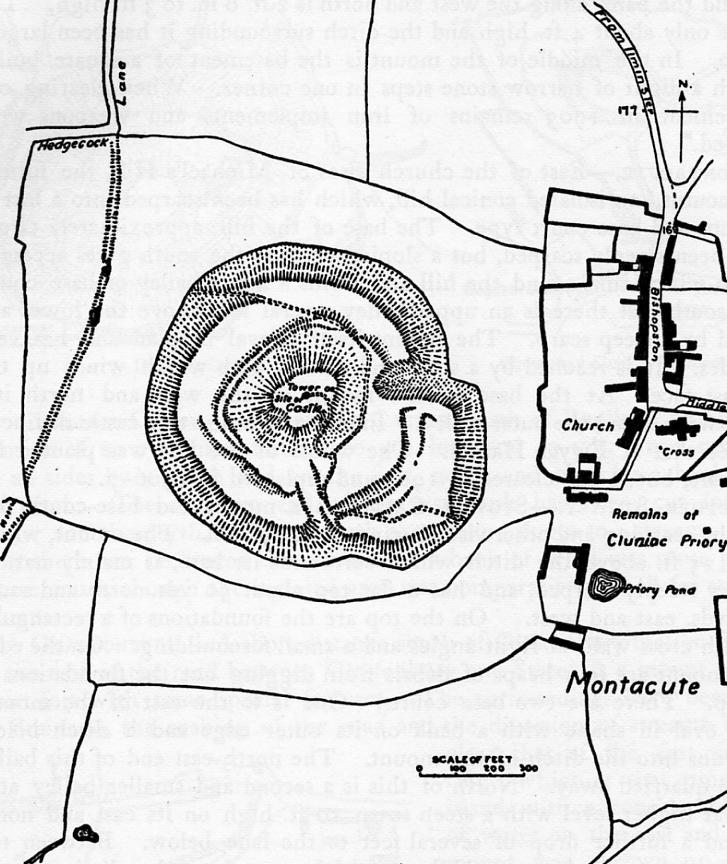
Motte and bailey castle at St Michael's Hill

Originally called Logaresburgh by the Saxons, it was later known as Bishopstone ("Bishop's Town", i.e. "estate belonging to the Bishop") or Biscepstone which name survives today as the street named "Bishopston". The last Anglo-Saxons to own it before the Norman Conquest of 1066 were Tofig (d.1043), then successively his son Athelstan (or Æthelstan) and his grandson Asgar. Tofig was a staller (placeman or court office-holder) to Danish King Canute. Local tradition remembers Tofig as "Cnut's standard bearer". In 1030 (1035 in some records) following a series of dreams in which the Devil told him where to dig, a local blacksmith found buried on St Michael's Hill a black flint crucifix or Holy Rood. (Some early versions state two black flint crosses were found, one large, one small. Another variant is that the second cross was wooden, and accompanied by a bell and a book/copy of the gospels.) Tofig loaded the life-sized cross (or crosses) onto a cart, and then named a series of possible destinations owned by him. The oxen pulling the wagon (six red and six white in one version of the tale) refused to move until he said Waltham in Essex, where Tofig already had a hunting lodge. They then started, and continued non-stop until they reached Waltham, and where they stopped Tofig decided to build an abbey at the site – this became Waltham Abbey. In the meantime, Tofig rebuilt the church at Waltham to house the cross, on which he bestowed his own sword, and his second wife Gytha (or Glitha), the daughter of Osgod Clapa, adorned the figure with a crown, bands of gold and precious stones.

The cross became the object of pilgrimage, notably by Harold Godwinson. It was at Tofig's wedding at Lambeth on 8 June 1042 that King Harthacnut suddenly died of a convulsion "while standing at his drink". "Holy Cross" became the battle-cry of Harold's armies at the battles of Stamford Bridge and Hastings. The Holy Rood is said to have foretold Harold's defeat at Hastings: on the way there from the Battle of Stamford Bridge he stopped off at Waltham Abbey to pray, and the legend is that the cross "bowed down" off the wall as he did so, taken as a portent of doom. There have been suggestions that the smaller cross became the "Holy Rood" which was carried to Scotland from Waltham Abbey by St Margaret. There has been further speculation that the site the relics were excavated from was the burial site of Joseph of Arimathea.

On Tofig's death in circa 1043, his estates passed to his son Athelstan (or Æthelstan) and then to his grandson Asgar. Following the invasion of 1066 it was held by Robert, Count of Mortain, who built the motte-and-bailey Montacute Castle on St Michael's Hill (the Mons Acutus) in 1068. The site of the castle was a deliberate affront to the defeated Saxons, because it was the site where Tofig had discovered the "Holy Rood" crucifix. Robert later founded the Cluniac priory on an adjacent site. The parish of Montacute was part of the Tintinhull Hundred.

Montacute Castle was besieged by Saxon rebels from Somerset, Dorset and neighbouring areas in 1069 and its relief required the assembly of a considerable force, drawn chiefly from the Norman garrisons of London, Winchester and Salisbury. This army was led by the Norman bishop, Geoffrey of Coutances, whose large landholdings were also threatened. The rebels were taken by surprise and bloodily defeated, putting an end to the revolt. Joseph Bettey has suggested that "the devastation in the surrounding area which followed the English defeat may explain why so many manors in south Somerset are recorded in the Domesday Survey as having decreased in value". The English dead were buried in a mass grave to the west of the village in a sloping field now known as "Under Warren". Village tradition has it that two hilltop fortifications were built: first a wooden clamshell fort with motte & bailey, later replaced by a stone castle. However little evidence to prove the existence of either structure exists, except a note in the parish records that two loads of stone were taken from the site by the neighbouring parish of Martock. A church or chapel dedicated to St Michael later replaced the castle. Excavations of the hilltop have been limited and inconclusive.

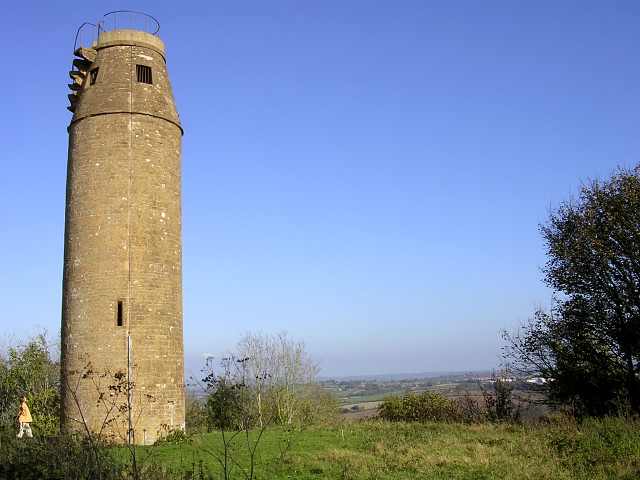
St Michael's Tower

A folly tower, built in 1760 by Edward Phelips V now occupies the hill-top. Known as St Michael's Tower it stands on Mons Acutus which was the site of the former castle. The Hamstone tower is about 16 feet (4.9 m) in diameter, and rises 49 feet (14.9 m) before curving inwards to a viewing platform which is reached via a 52 step spiral staircase. It has been designated as a Grade II listed building and scheduled monument. Village legends exist about the tower. One is of the supposed existence of a hidden tunnel between the tower and Montacute House. This has never been found and is more likely to be a folk memory of the remains of the Norman castle. The other is that a daughter of the Phelips family was kept locked in the tower for attempting to marry against her father's wishes.

Considerable motte & bailey earthworks are built into St Michael's Hill, which the Somerset County Archeologist unit incorrectly suggests were wine-growing terraces. The wine terraces were actually on the north flank of the adjacent Hedgecock Hill.

There are two abandoned dwelling sites within the village, both close to Batemore Barn. One is the hamlet of Witcombe/Whitcombe, along the route of the Roman road leading from Batemore to High Wood along the Witcombe valley. The foundations of several buildings still exist there and have been excavated. Locally Witcombe is remembered as a plague village. The other dwelling site is on the north side of Batemore barn, close to the bottom of the ancient hollow-way (now filled in) known as "Foister's Gully". Little remains of this and it has not been excavated, but may have been the residence of highwayman Richard Foister/Foster/Forster, remembered locally as the last man to be gibbeted alive in England. Some of his murders were said to have taken place in the area. Also in the Witcombe valley, high up close to the boundary with the field known as "Fairyland" are the remains of an old lime kiln. Ham Hill stone was burnt to make soil fertiliser, the lime was of poor quality for building due to its high iron content which made mortar blow.

Fulfitt Terrace is an early 20th century council house development on the street named Townsend and is believed to be one of the earliest, if not the earliest, council house schemes in Britain. Townsend itself is believed to be Roman in origin and runs into the ancient hollow-way Hollow Lane which runs to the Ham Hill plateau, forming one of the entrances through the hill fortifications.

Montacute is visited by tourists who come to the area, attracted by the nearby Ham Hill Country Park, and Montacute House (now owned by the National Trust) which is one of the finest examples of an Elizabethan house in England, and several other mansions open to the public in the immediate vicinity.

In 2009 Montacute was identified as having England's longest life expectancy in a report compiled by Watson Wyatt Worldwide.

In November 2014 Montacute featured in the programme 'Hidden Villages' presented by Penelope Keith.

== Governance ==
The parish council has responsibility for local issues, including setting an annual precept (local rate) to cover the council's operating costs and producing annual accounts for public scrutiny. The parish council evaluates local planning applications and works with the local police, district council officers, and neighbourhood watch groups on matters of crime, security and traffic. The parish council's role also includes initiating projects for the maintenance and repair of parish facilities, as well as consulting with the district council on the maintenance, repair and improvement of highways, drainage, footpaths, public transport and street cleaning. Conservation matters (including trees and listed buildings) and environmental issues are also the responsibility of the council.

For local government purposes, since 1 April 2023, the parish comes under the unitary authority of Somerset Council. Prior to this, it was part of the non-metropolitan district of South Somerset (established under the Local Government Act 1972). It was part of Yeovil Rural District before 1974.

The village falls within 'St Michel's' electoral ward. Although Martock is the most populous area the ward stretches to the River Yeo beyond Tintinhull in the north. The total population of this ward at the 2011 census was 2,307.

It is also part of the Glastonbury and Somerton county constituency represented in the House of Commons of the Parliament of the United Kingdom. It elects one Member of Parliament (MP) by the first-past-the-post system of election.

== Geography ==
An area of grass parkland lies to the east of the village; this formed the eastern approach to Montacute House though the drive through the park is now unused. Although associated with the Montacute estate, the park lies mainly within the neighbouring village of Odcombe. To the south of the village, bounded by Woodhouse Lane, and the Roman roads of Park Lane and Hollow Lane lies the older Deer Park: this is divided into High Park and Low Park by the woodland path known as Ladies Walk. The oldest extant known road in the village is a track leading from the front of the Abbey Gatehouse to Ham Hill, via the defensive ramparts of Ham Hill. This track crosses another presumed Roman Road which runs on the line of Stanchester (site of a Roman villa) - Under Warren (abandoned settlement) Batemore (Roman villa) - Witcombe (abandoned settlement) - Norton Lane — High Wood. Another ancient track struck northeast from The Borough toward Ilchester, and is revealed by the housing layout but the route across the park has been lost. This and the track to Ham Hill may possibly mark a Roman route between the fortifications of Ilchester and Ham Hill, but are probably older.

In addition to being a scheduled monument, Iron Age hill fort and Roman site, Ham Hill itself is a geological Site of Special Scientific Interest (SSSI), local nature reserve and country park. The geology supports a wide range of fauna including mammals, birds, invertebrates, reptiles and amphibians living on lichens, fungi, ferns and flowering plants.

=== Climate ===
Typical for South West England, Montacute has a temperate climate which is generally wetter and milder than the rest of the country. The annual mean temperature is approximately 10 °C (50.0 °F). Seasonal temperature variation is less extreme than most of the United Kingdom because of the temperatures of the nearby sea. The summer months of July and August are the warmest with mean daily maxima of approximately 21 °C (69.8 °F). Winter mean minimum temperatures of 1 °C (33.8 °F) or 2 °C (35.6 °F) are common. In summer high pressure in the Azores often affects the south-west, however convective cloud sometimes forms inland, reducing the number of hours of sunshine. Annual sunshine rates are slightly less than the regional average of 1,600 hours. In December 1998 there were 20 days without sun recorded at nearby Yeovilton. Most of the south-west's rainfall is caused by either Atlantic depressions or convection. Most of the autumn and winter rainfall is caused by Atlantic low pressure systems, their period most frequent activity. In summer, a significant proportion of the rainfall is caused by convection, where the sun warms the ground causing showers or thunderstorms. Average summer rainfall is 700 mm (28 in). About 8–15 days of snowfall is typical. The highest mean wind speeds occur from November to March, whilst June to August sees the lowest. The predominant wind direction is from the south-west.

Climate data for Yeovilton, 20 m asl (1991–2020 normals), extremes 1964-
Month	Jan	Feb	Mar	Apr	May	Jun	Jul	Aug	Sep	Oct	Nov	Dec	Year
Record high °C (°F)	16.1 (61.0)	17.7 (63.9)	21.3 (70.3)	25.4 (77.7)	32.9 (91.2)	37.3 (99.1)	35.0 (95.0)	35.5 (95.9)	29.9 (85.8)	26.5 (79.7)	18.5 (65.3)	16.0 (60.8)	37.3 (99.1)
Mean daily maximum °C (°F)	8.6 (47.5)	9.0 (48.2)	11.2 (52.2)	13.9 (57.0)	17.1 (62.8)	19.9 (67.8)	21.9 (71.4)	21.6 (70.9)	19.2 (66.6)	15.3 (59.5)	11.5 (52.7)	9.0 (48.2)	14.9 (58.8)
Daily mean °C (°F)	5.3 (41.5)	5.4 (41.7)	7.1 (44.8)	9.2 (48.6)	12.3 (54.1)	15.1 (59.2)	17.1 (62.8)	16.9 (62.4)	14.6 (58.3)	11.5 (52.7)	8.0 (46.4)	5.7 (42.3)	10.7 (51.3)
Mean daily minimum °C (°F)	2.0 (35.6)	1.8 (35.2)	3.0 (37.4)	4.5 (40.1)	7.4 (45.3)	10.3 (50.5)	12.2 (54.0)	12.2 (54.0)	10.0 (50.0)	7.6 (45.7)	4.4 (39.9)	2.3 (36.1)	6.5 (43.7)
Record low °C (°F)	−16.1 (3.0)	−12.2 (10.0)	−10.0 (14.0)	−6.4 (20.5)	−4.1 (24.6)	0.0 (32.0)	4.4 (39.9)	2.9 (37.2)	−1.8 (28.8)	−4.8 (23.4)	−8.0 (17.6)	−14.2 (6.4)	−16.1 (3.0)
Average precipitation mm (inches)	70.0 (2.76)	50.9 (2.00)	48.5 (1.91)	51.5 (2.03)	47.2 (1.86)	57.1 (2.25)	50.2 (1.98)	60.7 (2.39)	53.3 (2.10)	80.9 (3.19)	81.9 (3.22)	77.4 (3.05)	729.5 (28.72)
Average precipitation days (≥ 1.0 mm)	12.2	10.4	10.0	10.0	9.2	8.7	8.3	9.8	9.1	12.0	13.2	12.9	125.8
Mean monthly sunshine hours	59.5	79.5	121.6	170.5	202.2	199.8	205.3	185.5	149.2	107.6	71.6	53.5	1,605.7
Source 1: Met Office
Source 2: Starlings Roost Weather

== Religious sites ==
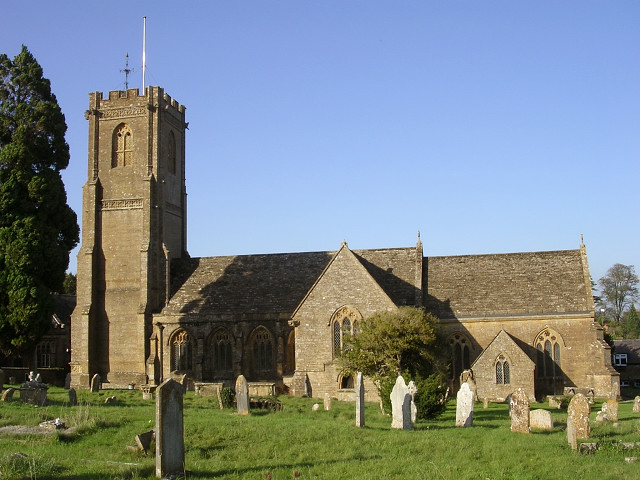
St Catherine's Church

The Church of St Catherine has 12th century origins, and is a Grade II* listed building. The church was altered in the 13th and 15th centuries and was extensively restored in 1870 by Henry Hall. The church contains monuments to the Phelips family including David and Ann, who died in 1484, and Bridget, who died 1508. There are canopied effigies of Thomas, died 1588, and Elizabeth, died 1598. On the west wall is a marble monument to Edward, who died in 1690. An Anglo-Saxon Hamstone font lay unidentified in the churchyard for many years, but has now been reinstated replacing its Tudor successor.

Little now remains of the Cluniac Montacute Priory, which fell during the Reformation, except the inaccurately named "Abbey Gatehouse" (a private dwelling) and its attached stew pond and pigeon cote. The former infirmary for the Priory — the Grade II thatched "Monk's House" dating from the 15th century — is also a private dwelling. The actual location of the priory is uncertain: the uneven ground in the field behind the church may be the site, however during the 1975-76 drought cropmarks clearly showed the previous existence of a demolished large building in the field named "Upper Meads" adjacent to Hollow Lane.

A chapel was built on St Michaels Hill, sharing the dedication to St Michael, following the demolition of the castle. Nothing now remains. Hill dedications to St Michael are common in the west country (e.g. Glastonbury Tor, St Michael's Mount) and may indicate a pre-Christian religious origin.

== Notable residents ==
The dissolved Priory of Montacute was obtained from King Henry VIII by the poet Thomas Wyatt in 1542 and after his death was passed in 1544 by his son, Thomas Wyatt the Younger, to Elizabeth Darrell, the poet's mistress, and their young son Francis, and they soon took up residence there.

Thomas Shoel (1759-1823), the self-taught poet and composer of sacred music, lived in the village.

The vicar of Montacute between 1885 and 1918 was the Reverend Charles Francis Powys (1843–1923), father of the writers John Cowper Powys, Llewelyn Powys and Theodore Francis Powys. Philippa Powys, their sister and another author, was born in Montacute. Llewelyn Powys, in his "Somerset Essays", devoted a chapter to Thomas Shoel (1759-1823), a native of the village who wrote poetry and composed music including many hymn tunes, some of them still well known In John Cowper Powys's novel first Wood and Stone (1915) the fictional village of Nevilton is based on Montacute.

== See also ==
- Listed buildings in Montacute
