= Listed buildings in Montacute =

Historic structures in Somerset, England

Montacute is a village and civil parish in Somerset, England. It contains 94 listed buildings that are recorded in the National Heritage List for England. Of these four are grade I, two are grade II* and 88 are grade II.

This list is based on the information retrieved online from Historic England.

== Key ==
| Grade | Criteria |
|---|---|
| I | Buildings that are of exceptional interest |
| II* | Particularly important buildings of more than special interest |
| II | Buildings that are of special interest |

== Listing ==
| Name | Grade | Location | Type | Completed (Note: The date given is the date used by Historic England as significant for the initial building or that of an important part in the structure's description.) | Date designated | Grid ref. (Note: The grid reference is based on the British national grid reference system, sometimes known as OSGB36, used by the Ordnance Survey.) Geo-coordinates | Notes | Entry number (Note: The "List Entry Number" is a unique number assigned to each listed building and scheduled monument by Historic England.) | Image | Wikidata |
|---|---|---|---|---|---|---|---|---|---|---|
| Abbey Farmhouse and Farm Gate and Stile to North West Corner | I | Abbey Farm Lane | | | 19 April 1961 | ST4959416890; 50°56′57″N 2°43′08″W | | 1057256 | Abbey Farmhouse and Farm Gate and Stile to North West Corner More images | Q4663998 |
| Group of Outbuildings about 12 Metres North of Abbey Farmhouse | II | Abbey Farm Lane | | | 19 April 1961 | ST4959416909; 50°56′58″N 2°43′08″W | | 1057257 | Upload Photo | Q26309086 |
| Abbey Gate | II | Abbey Farm Lane | | | 19 April 1961 | ST4962716937; 50°56′59″N 2°43′06″W | | 1251717 | Abbey Gate More images | Q26543654 |
| Range Of Farm Buildings, About 40 Metres South Of Abbey Farmhouse, and Pond About 5 Metres To East | II | About 40 Metres South Of Abbey Farmhouse, And Pond About 5 Metres To East, Abbey Farm Lane | | | 19 April 1961 | ST4959016831; 50°56′55″N 2°43′08″W | | 1251779 | Upload Photo | Q26543713 |
| Montacute Church Of England Voluntary Control Primary School, and Front Boundary Railings | II | Abbey Farm Lane | | | 19 April 1961 | ST4963416953; 50°56′59″N 2°43′06″W | | 1345762 | Montacute Church Of England Voluntary Control Primary School, and Front Boundary Railings More images | Q26629354 |
| Priory Dovecote, About 90 Metres East South East Of Abbey Farmhouse | II | Abbey Farm Lane | | | 19 April 1961 | ST4970116860; 50°56′56″N 2°43′03″W | | 1345763 | Upload Photo | Q26629355 |
| Range Of Farmbuildings, About 5 Metres North West Of Myrtle Farmhouse | II | Back Lane | | | 27 October 1987 | ST4990516892; 50°56′57″N 2°42′52″W | | 1057258 | Upload Photo | Q26309087 |
| Myrtle Farmhouse | II | Back Lane | | | 27 October 1987 | ST4992016882; 50°56′57″N 2°42′51″W | | 1262544 | Upload Photo | Q26553412 |
| No 50, With Front Boundary Railings and North Wing Wall | II | 50, Bishopston | | | 27 October 1987 | ST4964016965; 50°57′00″N 2°43′06″W | | 1251690 | Upload Photo | Q26543626 |
| North West Gateway to Montacute House | II | Bishopston | | | 19 April 1961 | ST4964517288; 50°57′10″N 2°43′06″W | | 1251893 | Upload Photo | Q26543813 |
| The Kings Arms Inn | II | Bishopston | | | 19 April 1961 | ST4964116983; 50°57′00″N 2°43′06″W | | 1252006 | The Kings Arms Inn More images | Q26543915 |
| Monks House | II | Bishopston | | | 19 April 1961 | ST4968317191; 50°57′07″N 2°43′04″W | | 1345764 | Upload Photo | Q26629356 |
| Baytree Farmhouse | II | 6, Bishopston | | | 19 April 1961 | ST4968917157; 50°57′06″N 2°43′03″W | | 1262522 | Upload Photo | Q26553391 |
| 29 and 30, Bishopston | II | 29 and 30, Bishopston | | | 19 April 1961 | ST4964517069; 50°57′03″N 2°43′06″W | | 1057216 | Upload Photo | Q26309043 |
| 35, Shop (Montacute Gallery) and 36, Bishopston | II | 35, Bishopston | | | 19 April 1961 | ST4964317040; 50°57′02″N 2°43′06″W | | 1262497 | Upload Photo | Q26553367 |
| The Old Vicarage And Adjacent Gateway And Boundary Wall | II | 43, Bishopston | | | 19 April 1961 | ST4967316996; 50°57′01″N 2°43′04″W | | 1057259 | The Old Vicarage And Adjacent Gateway And Boundary Wall More images | Q26309088 |
| 46, 47 and 48, Bishopston | II | 46, 47 and 48, Bishopston | | | 19 April 1961 | ST4964116995; 50°57′01″N 2°43′06″W | | 1345784 | 46, 47 and 48, Bishopston More images | Q26629374 |
| Park House | II | Hyde Road | | | 27 October 1987 | ST4964717392; 50°57′13″N 2°43′06″W | | 1253538 | Upload Photo | Q26545284 |
| Stone at Entrance to Gaundle Farm (not Included on List) | II | Lower Town | | | 27 October 1987 | ST5006417564; 50°57′19″N 2°42′44″W | | 1261722 | Upload Photo | Q26552653 |
| Church Of St Catherine | II* | Middle Street | | | 19 April 1961 | ST4967316952; 50°56′59″N 2°43′04″W | | 1253547 | Church Of St Catherine More images | Q17554479 |
| Coffin Lid In Churchyard, Against North Face Of Tower, Church Of St Catherine | II | Middle Street | | | 27 October 1987 | ST4965716954; 50°56′59″N 2°43′05″W | | 1253548 | Upload Photo | Q26545293 |
| Stone Coffin In Churchyard, Against South Side Of Tower, Church Of St Catherine | II | Middle Street | | | 27 October 1987 | ST4965716946; 50°56′59″N 2°43′05″W | | 1253549 | Upload Photo | Q26545294 |
| Unidentified Monument In Churchyard, About 12 Metres South South East Of Tower, Church Of St Catherine | II | Middle Street | | | 27 October 1987 | ST4965416935; 50°56′59″N 2°43′05″W | | 1253550 | Unidentified Monument In Churchyard, About 12 Metres South South East Of Tower, Church Of St Catherine More images | Q26545295 |
| Unidentified Monument In Churchyard, About 29 Metres South Of Tower, Church Of St Catherine | II | Middle Street | | | 27 October 1987 | ST4965516917; 50°56′58″N 2°43′05″W | | 1253551 | Upload Photo | Q26545296 |
| Unidentified Monument In Churchyard, About 28 Metres South Of Nave, Church Of St Catherine | II | Middle Street | | | 27 October 1987 | ST4966316919; 50°56′58″N 2°43′05″W | | 1253552 | Unidentified Monument In Churchyard, About 28 Metres South Of Nave, Church Of St Catherine More images | Q26545297 |
| Unidentified Monument In Churchyard, About 30 Metres South South East Of Tower, Church Of St Catherine | II | Middle Street | | | 27 October 1987 | ST4964516919; 50°56′58″N 2°43′06″W | | 1253694 | Upload Photo | Q26545424 |
| Medieval Stone Feature In Churchyard, About 17 Metres South Of Nave, Church Of St Catherine | II | Middle Street | | | 27 October 1987 | ST4966816931; 50°56′59″N 2°43′04″W | | 1253699 | Medieval Stone Feature In Churchyard, About 17 Metres South Of Nave, Church Of St Catherine More images | Q26545428 |
| Unidentified Monument In Churchyard, About 10 Metres South Of Nave, Church Of St Catherine | II | Middle Street | | | 27 October 1987 | ST4967016932; 50°56′59″N 2°43′04″W | | 1253700 | Unidentified Monument In Churchyard, About 10 Metres South Of Nave, Church Of St Catherine More images | Q26545429 |
| Trask Monument In Churchyard, About 16 Metres South Of South Transept, Church Of St Catherine | II | Middle Street | | | 27 October 1987 | ST4967116925; 50°56′58″N 2°43′04″W | | 1253701 | Trask Monument In Churchyard, About 16 Metres South Of South Transept, Church Of St Catherine More images | Q26545430 |
| Richmond Chubb Monument In Churchyard, About 3 Metres South Of Vestry, Church Of St Catherine | II | Middle Street | | | 27 October 1987 | ST4968216938; 50°56′59″N 2°43′04″W | | 1253702 | Richmond Chubb Monument In Churchyard, About 3 Metres South Of Vestry, Church Of St Catherine More images | Q26545431 |
| Unidentified Monument In Churchyard, About 8 Metres South Of Chancel, Church Of St Catherine | II | Middle Street | | | 27 October 1987 | ST4968316933; 50°56′59″N 2°43′04″W | | 1253703 | Unidentified Monument In Churchyard, About 8 Metres South Of Chancel, Church Of St Catherine More images | Q26545432 |
| Trent Monument In Churchyard, About 21 Metres South Of Chancel, Church Of St Catherine | II | Middle Street | | | 27 October 1987 | ST4969016924; 50°56′58″N 2°43′03″W | | 1253704 | Trent Monument In Churchyard, About 21 Metres South Of Chancel, Church Of St Catherine More images | Q26545433 |
| North and West Boundary Walls, and North-West Gateway, To Church Of St. Catherine | II | Middle Street | | | 27 October 1987 | ST4966216964; 50°57′00″N 2°43′05″W | | 1253706 | Upload Photo | Q26545435 |
| The Two Houses Immediately West Of, and Attached To No 27 The Borough | II | Middle Street | | | 27 October 1987 | ST4976916956; 50°56′59″N 2°42′59″W | | 1261599 | The Two Houses Immediately West Of, and Attached To No 27 The Borough More images | Q26552534 |
| Unidentified Monument In Churchyard, About 31 Metres South Of Tower, Church Of St Catherine | II | Middle Street | | | 27 October 1987 | ST4965216916; 50°56′58″N 2°43′05″W | | 1261647 | Upload Photo | Q26552580 |
| Baker Monument In Churchyard, About 28 Metres South Of Nave, Church Of St Catherine | II | Middle Street | | | 27 October 1987 | ST4966216919; 50°56′58″N 2°43′05″W | | 1261648 | Upload Photo | Q26552581 |
| Unidentified Monument In Churchyard, About 9 Metres South Of Nave, Church Of St Catherine | II | Middle Street | | | 27 October 1987 | ST4966916932; 50°56′59″N 2°43′04″W | | 1261650 | Unidentified Monument In Churchyard, About 9 Metres South Of Nave, Church Of St Catherine More images | Q26552583 |
| Unidentified Monument In Churchyard, About 4 Metres South Of South Transept, Church Of St Catherine | II | Middle Street | | | 27 October 1987 | ST4967716936; 50°56′59″N 2°43′04″W | | 1261651 | Unidentified Monument In Churchyard, About 4 Metres South Of South Transept, Church Of St Catherine More images | Q26552584 |
| Didd Monument In Churchyard, About 7 Metres South Of Chancel, Church Of St Catherine | II | Middle Street | | | 27 October 1987 | ST4968516935; 50°56′59″N 2°43′03″W | | 1261652 | Didd Monument In Churchyard, About 7 Metres South Of Chancel, Church Of St Catherine More images | Q26552585 |
| Hodder Monument In Churchyard, About 21 Metres South Of Chancel, Church Of St Catherine | II | Middle Street | | | 27 October 1987 | ST4968916923; 50°56′58″N 2°43′03″W | | 1261653 | Hodder Monument In Churchyard, About 21 Metres South Of Chancel, Church Of St Catherine More images | Q26552586 |
| Unidentified Monument In Churchyard, About 4 Metres East Of Chancel, Church Of St Catherine | II | Middle Street | | | 27 October 1987 | ST4969516955; 50°56′59″N 2°43′03″W | | 1261654 | Unidentified Monument In Churchyard, About 4 Metres East Of Chancel, Church Of St Catherine More images | Q26552587 |
| Wilton Monument In Churchyard, About 9 Metres East Of Chancel, Church Of St Catherine | II | Middle Street | | | 27 October 1987 | ST4970016951; 50°56′59″N 2°43′03″W | | 1261655 | Wilton Monument In Churchyard, About 9 Metres East Of Chancel, Church Of St Catherine More images | Q26552588 |
| Remains Of Cross In Churchyard, About 8 Metres South Of Tower, Church Of St Catherine | II | Middle Street | | | 19 April 1961 | ST4965916933; 50°56′59″N 2°43′05″W | | 1261724 | Remains Of Cross In Churchyard, About 8 Metres South Of Tower, Church Of St Catherine More images | Q26552655 |
| Unidentified Monument In Churchyard, About 19 Metres South South East Of Tower, Church Of St Catherine | II | Middle Street | | | 27 October 1987 | ST4965416929; 50°56′59″N 2°43′05″W | | 1261725 | Unidentified Monument In Churchyard, About 19 Metres South South East Of Tower, Church Of St Catherine More images | Q26552656 |
| Jasmine Cottage | II | 4, Middle Street | | | 19 April 1961 | ST4974116973; 50°57′00″N 2°43′01″W | | 1253540 | Jasmine Cottage More images | Q26545286 |
| 6 and 8, Middle Street | II | 6 and 8, Middle Street | | | 19 April 1961 | ST4974916973; 50°57′00″N 2°43′00″W | | 1261723 | 6 and 8, Middle Street More images | Q26552654 |
| Carents Cottage | II | 7, Middle Street | | | 19 April 1961 | ST4974916957; 50°56′59″N 2°43′00″W | | 1253707 | Carents Cottage More images | Q26545436 |
| Greystone Cottage | II | 9, Middle Street | | | 19 April 1961 | ST4975516957; 50°56′59″N 2°43′00″W | | 1253801 | Greystone Cottage More images | Q26545523 |
| 10, Middle Street | II | 10, Middle Street | | | 19 April 1961 | ST4975716972; 50°57′00″N 2°43′00″W | | 1253541 | Upload Photo | Q26545287 |
| 11a, Middle Street | II | 11a, Middle Street | | | 19 April 1961 | ST4977216969; 50°57′00″N 2°42′59″W | | 1253544 | 11a, Middle Street More images | Q26545290 |
| 12, Middle Street | II | 12, Middle Street | | | 19 April 1961 | ST4978116969; 50°57′00″N 2°42′59″W | | 1253545 | 12, Middle Street More images | Q26545291 |
| 13, Middle Street | II | 13, Middle Street | | | 19 April 1961 | ST4979616967; 50°57′00″N 2°42′58″W | | 1253546 | 13, Middle Street More images | Q26545292 |
| 10a, Middle Street | II | 10a, Middle Street | | | 19 April 1961 | ST4976516970; 50°57′00″N 2°42′59″W | | 1253542 | Upload Photo | Q26545288 |
| Milestone at NGR ST 4999 1611 | II | Park Lane | | | 27 October 1987 | ST4998416120; 50°56′32″N 2°42′48″W | | 1260414 | Upload Photo | Q26551431 |
| Montacute Baptist Church, and Front Boundary Wall and Railings | II | South Street | | | 27 October 1987 | ST4986216878; 50°56′57″N 2°42′54″W | | 1261601 | Montacute Baptist Church, and Front Boundary Wall and Railings More images | Q26552536 |
| 1, South Street | II | 1, South Street | | | 27 October 1987 | ST4984216892; 50°56′57″N 2°42′55″W | | 1253802 | 1, South Street More images | Q26545524 |
| No 2, and Front Boundary Railings | II | 2, South Street | | | 27 October 1987 | ST4984316883; 50°56′57″N 2°42′55″W | | 1261600 | No 2, and Front Boundary Railings More images | Q26552535 |
| 3a, South Street | II | 3a, South Street | | | 27 October 1987 | ST4982116878; 50°56′57″N 2°42′56″W | | 1261602 | 3a, South Street More images | Q26552537 |
| 5 and 6, South Street | II | 5 and 6, South Street | | | 27 October 1987 | ST4984016864; 50°56′56″N 2°42′55″W | | 1253805 | 5 and 6, South Street More images | Q26545527 |
| 7, 8 and 9, South Street | II | 7, 8 and 9, South Street | | | 27 October 1987 | ST4984516856; 50°56′56″N 2°42′55″W | | 1253806 | 7, 8 and 9, South Street More images | Q26545528 |
| Tower on St Michaels Hill | II | St Michael's Hill | | | 19 April 1961 | ST4934816977; 50°57′00″N 2°43′21″W | | 1057255 | Upload Photo | Q26309085 |
| K6 Telephone Kiosk Outside Post Office | II | The Borough | | | 2 February 1988 | ST4980416905; 50°56′58″N 2°42′57″W | | 1116903 | K6 Telephone Kiosk Outside Post Office More images | Q26410479 |
| Drinking Fountain | II | The Borough | | | 27 October 1987 | ST4980316941; 50°56′59″N 2°42′57″W | | 1252007 | Drinking Fountain More images | Q26543916 |
| Phelips Arms Hotel | II | The Borough | | | 19 April 1961 | ST4983216917; 50°56′58″N 2°42′56″W | | 1252011 | Phelips Arms Hotel More images | Q26543920 |
| Privy about 15 Metres West of No 21 the Borough | II | The Borough | | | 27 October 1987 | ST4976216916; 50°56′58″N 2°43′00″W | | 1252016 | Upload Photo | Q26543925 |
| 27, The Borough | II | The Borough | | | 19 April 1961 | ST4978316955; 50°56′59″N 2°42′58″W | | 1252019 | 27, The Borough More images | Q26543928 |
| Montacute House | I | The Borough, TA15 6XP | | | 19 April 1961 | ST4994117167; 50°57′06″N 2°42′50″W | | 1252021 | Montacute House More images | Q1635679 |
| The North Terrace, Retaining Wall and Central Steps, To Montacute House | II | The Borough, TA15 6XP | | | 27 October 1987 | ST4997717193; 50°57′07″N 2°42′49″W | | 1252022 | The North Terrace, Retaining Wall and Central Steps, To Montacute House More images | Q26543930 |
| Three Flights Of Stairs Into Sunken Garden Immediately North Of Montacute House | II | The Borough, TA15 6XP | | | 27 October 1987 | ST5000817273; 50°57′10″N 2°42′47″W | | 1252024 | Three Flights Of Stairs Into Sunken Garden Immediately North Of Montacute House More images | Q26543931 |
| Walls, Turrets and Gateway To East Forecourt Of Montacute House | I | The Borough, TA15 6XP | | | 19 April 1961 | ST5000017143; 50°57′06″N 2°42′47″W | | 1252025 | Walls, Turrets and Gateway To East Forecourt Of Montacute House More images | Q17530119 |
| Quadrangle, About 6 Metres South Of Montacute House, and Walls Enclosing Car Park To South | II | The Borough, TA15 6XP | | | 19 April 1961 | ST4993417121; 50°57′05″N 2°42′51″W | | 1252026 | Upload Photo | Q26543932 |
| Summerhouse, About 120 Metres South Of Montacute House, and The Row Of 5 Freestanding Columns To East | II | The Borough, TA15 6XP | | | 19 April 1961 | ST4990917027; 50°57′02″N 2°42′52″W | | 1252027 | Summerhouse, About 120 Metres South Of Montacute House, and The Row Of 5 Freestanding Columns To East More images | Q26543933 |
| The Lodge, About 165 Metres South-South-West Of Montacute House | II* | The Borough, TA15 6XP | | | 19 April 1961 | ST4981617012; 50°57′01″N 2°42′57″W | | 1252028 | The Lodge, About 165 Metres South-South-West Of Montacute House More images | Q69905696 |
| Stable Block, About 70 Metres South-West Of Montacute House | II | The Borough, TA15 6XP | | | 19 April 1961 | ST4984217112; 50°57′04″N 2°42′56″W | | 1252407 | Stable Block, About 70 Metres South-West Of Montacute House More images | Q26544275 |
| Walls Enclosing South Car Park, About 150 M South Of Montacute House | II | The Borough, TA15 6XP | | | 27 October 1987 | ST4988017024; 50°57′02″N 2°42′54″W | | 1252438 | Walls Enclosing South Car Park, About 150 M South Of Montacute House More images | Q26544305 |
| South-West Gateway To Montacute House | II | The Borough, TA15 6XP | | | 27 October 1987 | ST4981816985; 50°57′00″N 2°42′57″W | | 1262471 | South-West Gateway To Montacute House More images | Q26553343 |
| The Orangery and Linking Wing Walling To The North-West Corner Of Montacute House | II | The Borough, TA15 6XP | | | 19 April 1961 | ST4992917206; 50°57′08″N 2°42′51″W | | 1262472 | The Orangery and Linking Wing Walling To The North-West Corner Of Montacute House More images | Q26553344 |
| Pool With Fountain In North Garden, About 60 Metres North-North-West Of Montacute House | II | The Borough, TA15 6XP | | | 27 October 1987 | ST4999317233; 50°57′08″N 2°42′48″W | | 1262473 | Pool With Fountain In North Garden, About 60 Metres North-North-West Of Montacute House More images | Q26553345 |
| East Patio, With Steps and Columns, To Montacute House | II | The Borough, TA15 6XP | | | 27 October 1987 | ST4995417162; 50°57′06″N 2°42′50″W | | 1262474 | East Patio, With Steps and Columns, To Montacute House More images | Q26553346 |
| North-East and South-East Pavilions To East Forecourt, Montacute House | I | The Borough, TA15 6XP | | | 19 April 1961 | ST4999117119; 50°57′05″N 2°42′48″W | | 1262475 | North-East and South-East Pavilions To East Forecourt, Montacute House More images | Q17530125 |
| Montacute Cottage | II | 1, The Borough | | | 19 April 1961 | ST4982616976; 50°57′00″N 2°42′56″W | | 1262467 | Montacute Cottage More images | Q26553339 |
| The Chantry | II | 2, The Borough | | | 27 October 1987 | ST4982216966; 50°57′00″N 2°42′56″W | | 1252008 | The Chantry More images | Q26543917 |
| 3 and 4, The Borough | II | 3 and 4, The Borough | | | 19 April 1961 | ST4983216958; 50°56′59″N 2°42′56″W | | 1262468 | 3 and 4, The Borough More images | Q26553340 |
| The Old Bakery | II | 5, The Borough | | | 19 April 1961 | ST4983316950; 50°56′59″N 2°42′56″W | | 1252122 | The Old Bakery More images | Q26544024 |
| 6, The Borough | II | 6, The Borough | | | 19 April 1961 | ST4983516941; 50°56′59″N 2°42′56″W | | 1252009 | 6, The Borough More images | Q26543918 |
| 7 and 8, The Borough | II | 7 and 8, The Borough | | | 19 April 1961 | ST4983416928; 50°56′59″N 2°42′56″W | | 1252142 | 7 and 8, The Borough More images | Q26544043 |
| The Milk House | II | 17, The Borough | | | 19 April 1961 | ST4981516899; 50°56′58″N 2°42′57″W | | 1252012 | The Milk House More images | Q26543921 |
| Post Office and Telephone Call Box Adjoining | II | 18, The Borough | | | 19 April 1961 | ST4980516899; 50°56′58″N 2°42′57″W | | 1252154 | Post Office and Telephone Call Box Adjoining More images | Q26544051 |
| 19 and 20, The Borough | II | 19 and 20, The Borough | | | 19 April 1961 | ST4979516900; 50°56′58″N 2°42′58″W | | 1252013 | Upload Photo | Q26543922 |
| No 21 and Linking Wall to South | II | 21, The Borough | | | 19 April 1961 | ST4978616914; 50°56′58″N 2°42′58″W | | 1252225 | No 21 and Linking Wall to South More images | Q26544113 |
| 22, The Borough | II | 22, The Borough | | | 19 April 1961 | ST4978516921; 50°56′58″N 2°42′58″W | | 1262384 | 22, The Borough More images | Q26553262 |
| 23 and 24, The Borough | II | 23 and 24, The Borough | | | 19 April 1961 | ST4978516931; 50°56′59″N 2°42′58″W | | 1252017 | 23 and 24, The Borough More images | Q26543926 |
| 25 (Acorn Cottage) and 26, The Borough | II | 26, The Borough | | | 19 April 1961 | ST4978616946; 50°56′59″N 2°42′58″W | | 1252249 | 25 (Acorn Cottage) and 26, The Borough More images | Q26544134 |
| Woodbine Cottage, With Front Boundary Railings | II | 1, Townsend | | | 27 October 1987 | ST4984716804; 50°56′55″N 2°42′55″W | | 1253807 | Woodbine Cottage, With Front Boundary Railings More images | Q26545529 |
| 3, Townsend | II | 3, Townsend | | | 27 October 1987 | ST4981516779; 50°56′54″N 2°42′57″W | | 1261603 | Upload Photo | Q26552538 |

== See also ==
- Grade I listed buildings in Somerset
- Grade II* listed buildings in Somerset

== Sources ==
- Orbach, Julien; Pevsner, Nikolaus (2014), Somerset: South and West, The Buildings of England, New Haven and London: Yale University Press, ISBN 978-0-300-20740-8
