= Gertrude Mary Powys =

British artist (1877–1952)

- Born: October 6, 1877; Brailsford, Derbyshire
- Died: April 23, 1952 (aged 74); Weymouth, Dorset
- Education: Slade School of Fine Art; Académie de la Grande Chaumière
- Occupation: Artist
- Relatives: John Cowper Powys, Llewelyn Powys, T. F. Powys (brothers); Philippa Powys (sister)

Gertrude Mary Powys (6 October 1877 – 23 April 1952) was a British artist, notable for her portraits of members of the literary Powys family, including John Cowper Powys and Llewelyn Powys.

== Early life ==
Gertrude Mary Powys was born in Brailsford, Derbyshire, in 1877, the fourth child and eldest daughter of the eleven children of Mary Cowper Johnson (1849–1914) and the Reverend Charles Francis Powys (1843–1923). Her siblings included the writers John Cowper Powys, Theodore Francis Powys, Llewelyn Powys, and Philippa Powys. Another sister, Marian Powys, became a world authority on old lace.

Gertrude was educated at home and then in 1898 studied art at the Yeovil School of Art and Science with her sister Marin Powys. Gertrude Powys subsequently studied art at the Slade School of Fine Art, University College, London in 1903. In 1913/14 she studiedb at the Academie de La Grande Chaumière in Paris. Between 1910–23 she lived at Montacute Vicarage, Somerset, with her father. Following her father's death in 1923, she returned to artistic study in Paris, before settling with her sister Philippa at Chydyok in East Chaldon, Dorset.

== Painting ==
Gertude Mary Powys' first solo exhibition was held at the Cooling Galleries in London in 1937. As well as portraits, it featured paintings and drawings of landscapes, her "Dorset scenes" being described as "strong in colour and sound in technique" by the Western Mail.

Between 1931 and 1950, she was a regular exhibitor at the annual exhibition of the Sherborne Art Club, showing portraits and landscapes. Works by Powys were also exhibited in Paris at the Salon de la Nationale de Beauc Arts.

Gertrude was extremely close to her brother Llewelyn, and illustrated a number of his books, including Earth Memories (1934), Rats in the Sacristy (1937), and A Baker’s Dozen (1941). Portraits by Gertrude of her brothers were also included in The Powys Brothers: a Study by Richard Heron Ward (1935).

Gertrude Mary Powys spent many years living with and caring for her father, and it has been argued that her "artistic career was sacrificed for the family." In The Life of Llewelyn Powys, Malcolm Elwin noted that:

John [Cowper Powys] recognized the debt owed by all the family when he dedicated Weymouth Sands ‘to Gertrude Mary Powys remembering her life with my father at Greenhill Terrace, Weymouth.’ Llewelyn witnessed all that this devotion meant in daily wastage of his gifted sister’s life, and fretted against the fate that denied her the time and training to develop fully her artistic talent.

Llewellyn Powys described his sister as: "a most generous, noble, distinguished creature—quite unsurpassed by any other woman I have ever seen. I am always happy with her." He dedicated Skin for Skin (1925) to his sister. Another brother, Littleton, wrote in his autobiography of: "my sister Gertrude, round whom like the sun we different members of the family like the planets revolve".

== Death ==
Gertrude Mary Powys died in Weymouth, Dorset on 23 April 1952.

An exhibition of her work was arranged in conjunction with the conference of The Powys Society in Bath in 1986.
