= Charles Lock (literary scholar) =

- Born: Dorchester, Dorset, England

Academic background
- Education: Marlborough College; Keble College, Oxford

Charles Lock (born in Dorchester, England) is a British literary scholar and professor emeritus of English literature at the University of Copenhagen, where he has worked since 1996.

He was educated at Keble College, Oxford. His supervisor was John Bayley. He has taught at Karlstad University, Sweden. From 1983, he was at the University of Toronto, where he was appointed professor in 1993. He was an associate professor in Toronto.

His research is wide-ranging and encompasses petroglyphs, Derek Walcott, John Cowper Powys, Thomas Hardy, Byzantine iconography, the Codex Argenteus, and metaphor and metonymy. Within literary theory, he has been particularly concerned with Mikhail Bakhtin and Roman Jakobson. His work on book history and semiotics deals, among other things, with punctuation and layout. In 2006, Lock introduced the literary-theoretical concept of heterographics: "that is, forms of writing that draw attention to different scripts and alphabets."

John Cowper Powys was the subject of Lock's Oxford dissertation. He was associated with The Powys Journal from 1990, served as its editor from 2010 to 2020, and in 2013 edited the correspondence between Powys and James Purdy. Lock and Maria Cecilia Holt arranged the transport and interment of Purdy's ashes in England. He was Purdy's literary executor.

He was a close friend of Anne Blonstein and served as her literary executor after her death.
