= Tovi the Proud =

11th-century Danish thegn

Tovi the Proud (also Tofi or Tofig, Tofi pruda), fl. 1018–1043, was a rich and powerful 11th-century Danish thegn who held a number of estates in various parts of southern England. A translation of the legend of Waltham Abbey cites the Lord of Waltham as 'Tovi le Prude', (prude = prudent, wise, sagacious). He was staller (a placeman or court office-holder) to King Cnut the Great.

== Early life ==
Little is known about the years of Tovi the Proud pre-1026, though he appears to have had a role in the administration of East Anglia and Essex. These interests and gifted land holdings there indicate that prior to 1017, he was either in Cnut the Great's retinue or in that of Thorkell the Tall who was Jarl of East Anglia 1017 to 1023. By 1017 he was in possession of Reading. He went on to hold crucial roles in court 'guiding the monarch and closest to the king in his counsels'. Chronological problems of documents show ‘Tovi pruda’ to appear to have been added as a revision to earlier lists of secular officials from 1020 to 1021, his name having been placed at the head of secular officials, alongside his contemporary Osgod Clapa. Although in good enough health to have travelled from the far side of the kingdom where he had been on business with the king, he was considered already 'old and feeble' in the story of the legend of Waltham Holy Cross in the first half of the 1030s. This Waltham Chronicle also records that Tovi was 'a man of great wealth' (preduies), acquired not only through inheritance and the king's largesse, but also because his relationship with the king enabled him 'to benefit or harm anyone he wished.'

== The Legend of the Holy Cross ==
According to the Waltham Chronicle, it was on his manor at Montacute in Somerset that a black crucifix or Holy Rood was unearthed following a dream in 1030. The account relates that Tovi loaded the life-sized cross onto a cart, but the oxen refused to move until he mentioned another of his estates at Waltham in Essex where he already had a hunting lodge. Tovi rebuilt the church at Waltham to house the cross, on which he bestowed his own sword. His devout second wife Gytha (or Glitha), the daughter of Osgod Clapa, adorned the figure with a crown, bands of gold and precious stones. The cross became the object of pilgrimage, notably by Harold Godwinson. 'Thurkill the Sacristan', an eyewitness to the episode, told of the cross giving a sign foretelling the death of Harold at the Battle at Hastings in 1066, as recounted by the Canon of Waltham who was the author of De Inventione Sancte Crucus Nostre in the 12th century.

== 1040s ==
It was at Tovi's wedding at Lambeth on 8 June 1042 that King Harthacnut suddenly died of a convulsion "while standing at his drink". Harthacnut had little support as king and his mother Emma of Normandy, second wife of Cnut the Great, is implicated in bolstering Harthacnut's succession using her links with the East Anglian thegns in Cnut the Great's court. A return of stallers such as Tovi the Proud and Osgod Clapa to witness lists is found at this time.

There is no specific record for Tovi pruda after 1043. The Waltham Chronicle records Tovi and Glytha showering the Holy Cross with gifts which presumably would be in the period following their marriage in 1042. It is possible that Tovi died, simply left court to return to his estates, or was exiled following the dynastic pendulum swing back in favour of the native born Edward the Confessor in the early 1040s. Tovi's contemporary and new father-in-law Osgod Clapa, who appears to have been in opposition to Edward the Confessor's succession and led an unsuccessful revolt, was outlawed around 1046, later apparently to die in exile. Certainly the threat of invasion from Magnus the Good of Norway split the English court and led to King Edward confiscating the property of his mother, Queen Emma, who was planning to use it to help Magnus. However it is unclear if any of the above are reasons for Tovi pruda's absence or if political events elsewhere, in the by now disintegrated North Sea Empire, can account for it.

Adam of Breman briefly describes that in 1047 King Sven of Sweden and an otherwise unknown Earl Tovi drove Magnus from Denmark, and when Magnus resumed the war he [Magnus] died on board his ship. The contemporary Anglo-Saxon Chronicle reports that Sven of Sweden asked for 50 ships to help in the fight against Magnus and that, in England, Magnus was considered a serious threat, "but the battle between him and Sven prevented him from coming here". Notable circumstantially is that Osgod Clapa is thought to have entered the service of Sven in late 1046 and in the years following the victory in Denmark, Sven of Sweden's coinage shows many influences and a continued link with Anglo-Scandinavian England. It is possible that Tovi the Proud is the Tovi comes to whom King Edward gave two hides at Burghe in 1048.

== Land holdings ==
The Domesday records are a major source of information regarding Tovi's estates. Tovi the Sheriff, a Somerset landholder in 1086 is likely to be a descendant of Tovi the Proud. Unclear though, is how much land Tovi gifted to the church or to his kinsman during his lifetime. Evidence survives of a Tovi leaving land at Stilton, now in Cambridgeshire, to the church. It is known the estates pertaining to Tovi's position as staller passed to his son Athelstan (or Æthelstan) and to Tovi's grandson Asgar also known as the major land holder Ansgar the Staller, marshal in the court of Edward the Confessor. The Waltham Chronicle mentions Athelstan as losing those lands not connected to the position of staller through his 'insufficiencies' and the Chronicle translators cite suggestions that Athelstan is Ælfstan the Staller documented in Florence of Worcester's account of the Osgod Clapa led raids.

Following the Norman Conquest, Asgar the Staller's long running land dispute with the Diocese of Ely came to the attention of King William the Conqueror, who then had Asgar confined to a castle in France. Neither Asgar nor his two sons were to return to England. Asgar's estates were given to the Norman Baron Geoffrey de Mandeville. Waltham Abbey was described as being given to Harold Godwinson by St Edward (Edward the Confessor) in the Waltham Chronicle.

== Origins of his name ==
The root and meaning of the Tovi name is very ancient, with the clearest link for an older origin being found in the dedication on the Sønder Vissing Runestone. The carvings describe the stone as having been raised by Tófa, in memory of her mother. The first character of her name is ᛏ, the Rune for Týr, a Northern European deity thought to be of early origins in an Indo-European Pantheon. He was a sky god, god of justice, sacrifice and war. Later associations with Thor seen throughout the internet, in heraldry and publications, appear to have arisen not from evidence but from more modern speculations and probable confusion from the simplifications of multiple Norse deities. The dominance of Odin and Thor in the Norse pantheon coincides with the time that monotheistic religions such as Christianity were influencing and challenging the polytheism of the older cultures in Northern European regions. The letter V, often used as evidence that Tovi derives from a diminutive of a longer name was a Latinisation of the Rune ᚠ and Medieval additions to the Younger Futharc duplicated the use of some of the 16 Runic characters used in the 9th to 11th centuries. The Rune for V is the same as that used for F.

Pruda is from the Old Norse prúðr, meaning "proud/splendid fine; magnificent; stately; splendid; gallant; brave".

It is tempting to speculate that Tófi prúðr (Tovi pruda) was a younger relation named after Tófa (Tove of the Obotrites), but no direct evidence to support this has come to light at present other than the presence of a Tovi Wendish fl. 1066 in the Domesday records as land holder in parts of Gloucestershire However an Earl Tovi's presence in Denmark during 1047 adds a personal dimension to the conflict in the region at that time. Magnus the Good is attributed to have been responsible for the destruction of parts of Wendland; most notable in this instance as the heartland of the legendary Jomsvikings and ancestral homeland of Tove of the Obotrites. The earlier echoes of the Tovi and the Asgar names can be seen on the Sjörup Runestone attributed to the Jomsviking participation in the Battle of Fýrisvellir at Uppsala, but there is no other link to prove a family connection of Tófi prúðr (Tovi pruda) to Ásbjörn, the son of Tófi/Tóki other than by name. Other runestone translations also link a Tofi of an earlier generation to the lineage of Gorm the Old.

While it is often difficult to identify Tovi pruda from other Tovi thegns of Harthacnut and Edward the Confessor's court, circumstantially a link to Tove of the Obotrites and the court of Harald Bluetooth would do much to explain the preeminent position of Tovi pruda at the court of Cnut the Great during the establishment of the North Sea Empire. If Tovi had been in Thorkell the Tall's retinue in his early years, he would have been one of those to whom the Encomium Emmae was aimed, who remembered Thorkell as the great war leader in service to the king.

Present Day

Residents of Waltham Abbey regularly hold a commemorative day to celebrate the carrying of the Holy Cross from Somerset to Waltham, inviting possible descendants of Tovi pruda to take part.
