= John Cowper Powys =

English novelist and philosopher (1872–1963)

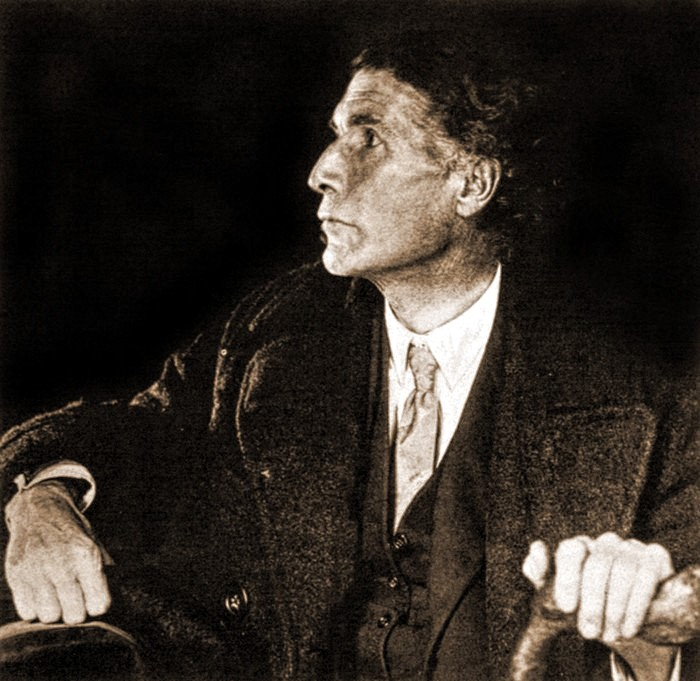
- Born: John Cowper Powys; 8 October 1872; Shirley, Derbyshire, England
- Died: 17 June 1963 (aged 90); Blaenau Ffestiniog, Wales
- Education: Corpus Christi College, Cambridge University
- Occupations: Philosopher, poet, lecturer, novelist, literary critic
- Spouses: Margaret Lyon; Phyllis Playter
- Writing career
- Period: 1915–1963
- Genres: Novel, poetry, philosophy
- Notable works: Wolf Solent (1929); A Glastonbury Romance (1932); Autobiography (1934); Owen Glendower (1941); Porius (1951)

John Cowper Powys (/ˈkuːpər ˈpoʊɪs/ KOO-pər POH-iss; 8 October 1872 – 17 June 1963) was an English novelist, philosopher, lecturer, critic and poet born in Shirley, Derbyshire, where his father was vicar of the parish church in 1871–1879. Powys appeared with a volume of verse in 1896 and a first novel in 1915, but gained success only with his novel Wolf Solent in 1929. He has been seen as a successor to Thomas Hardy, and Wolf Solent, A Glastonbury Romance (1932), Weymouth Sands (1934), and Maiden Castle (1936) have been called his Wessex novels. As with Hardy, landscape is important to his works. So is elemental philosophy in his characters' lives. In 1934 he published an autobiography. His itinerant lectures were a success in England and in 1905–1930 in the United States, where he wrote many of his novels and had several first published. He moved to Dorset, England, in 1934 with a US partner, Phyllis Playter. In 1935 they moved to Corwen, Merionethshire, Wales, where he set two novels, and in 1955 to Blaenau Ffestiniog, where he died in 1963.

== Biography ==
=== Early life ===
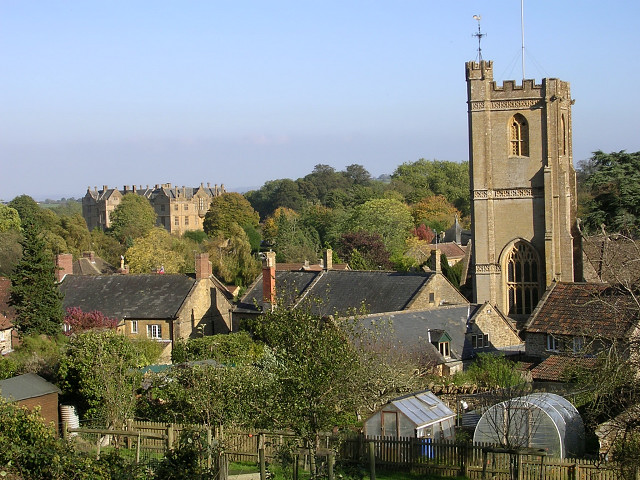
Montacute: Powys' father, the Reverend Charles Francis Powys (1843–1923) was the vicar between 1885 and 1918

Powys was born in Shirley, Derbyshire, in 1872, the son of the Reverend Charles Francis Powys (1843–1923) and Mary Cowper Johnson, granddaughter of Dr John Johnson, the cousin and close friend of the poet William Cowper. He came from a family of eleven children, many of whom were also talented. The family lived in Shirley between 1871 and 1879, briefly in Dorchester, Dorset, and then they moved to Montacute, Somerset, where Charles Powys was vicar for thirty-two years.

John Cowper Powys's two younger brothers Llewelyn Powys (1884–1939) and Theodore Francis Powys were well-known writers, while his sister Philippa Powys published a novel and some poetry, and Gertrude Mary Powys was an artist. Another sister, Marian Powys, was an authority on lace and lace-making and published a book on this subject. His brother A. R. Powys was Secretary of the Society for the Protection of Ancient Buildings, and he published a number of books on architectural subjects. Powys was educated at Sherborne School and graduated from Corpus Christi College, Cambridge, June 1894.

On 6 April 1896 he married Margaret Lyon. They had a son, Littleton Alfred, in 1902. Powys's first employment was teaching in girls' schools in Brighton, and then Eastbourne. His first published works were two highly derivative collections of poetry published in the 1890s. He worked from 1898 as an Extension lecturer throughout England, both for Oxford and Cambridge Universities.

=== Lecturer in America ===
Then from 1905 to the early 1930s, he lectured in the United States for the American Society for the Extension of University Teaching, gaining a reputation as a charismatic speaker. He spent his summers in England. During this time he travelled the length and breadth of the US, as well as into Canada. Powys's marriage was unsatisfactory, and Powys eventually lived a large part of each year in the USA, having relationships with various women. An important woman in his life was the American poet Frances Gregg, whom he first met in Philadelphia in 1912. He was also a friend of the famous dancer Isadora Duncan. Another friend and an important supporter in America was the novelist Theodore Dreiser. In 1921 he met Phyllis Playter, the twenty-six-year-old daughter of industrialist and business man Franklin Playter. Eventually they established a permanent relationship, though he was unable to divorce his wife Margaret, who was a Catholic. However, he diligently supported Margaret and the education of their son.

In the US he engaged in a public debate on marriage with the philosopher Bertrand Russell. He also debated with the philosopher and historian Will Durant. Powys was a witness in the obscenity trial of James Joyce's novel Ulysses, and was mentioned with approval in the autobiography of US feminist and anarchist Emma Goldman. Powys would later share Goldman's support for the Spanish Revolution.

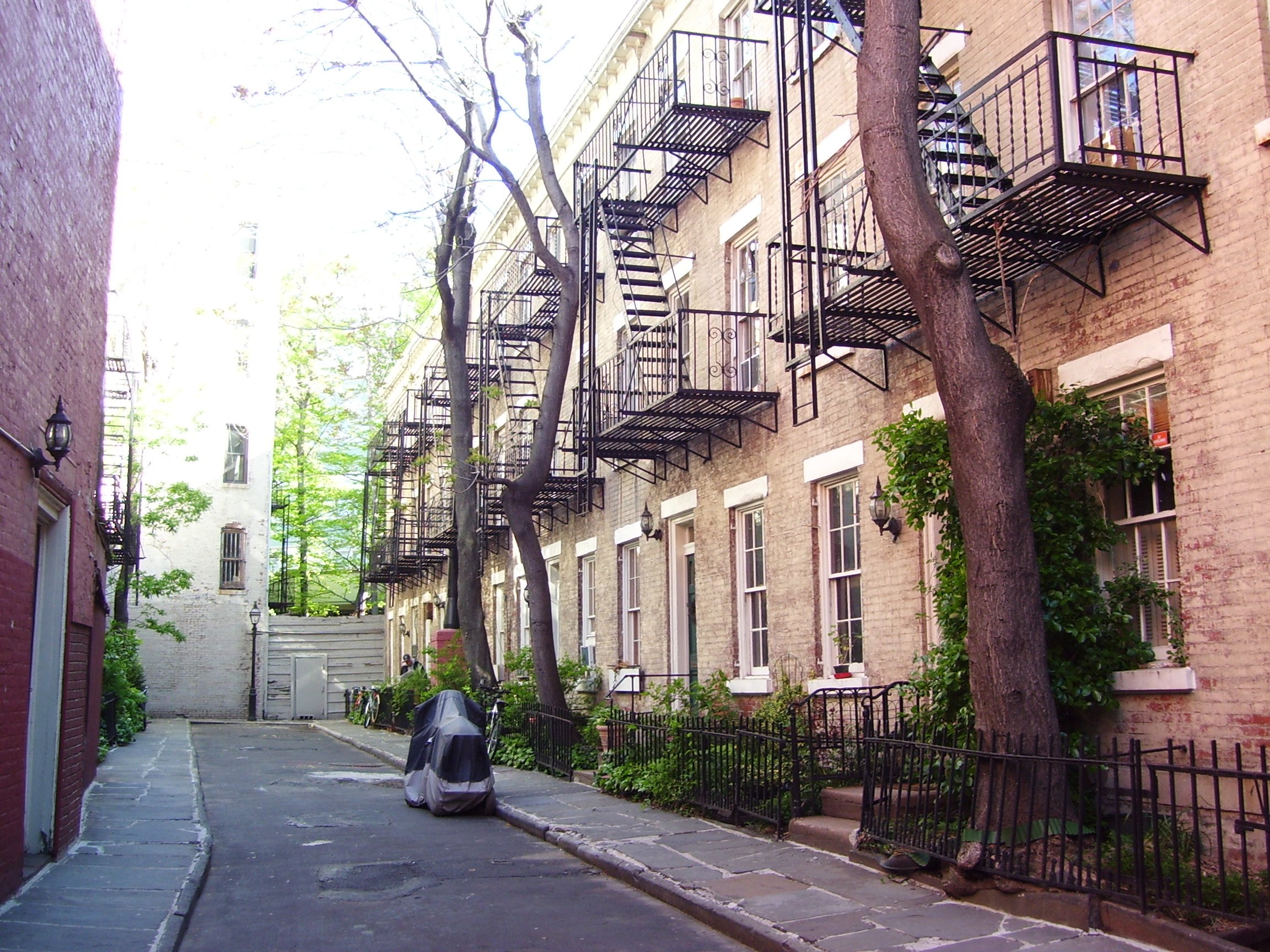
Patchin Place New York (2011) where Powys lived in Greenwich Village.

His first novel Wood and Stone, which Powys dedicated to Thomas Hardy, was published in 1915. This was followed by two collections of literary essays, Visions and Revisions (1915) and Suspended Judgment (1916). In Confessions of Two Brothers (1916), which contains a section written by his brother Llewelyn, Powys writes about his personal philosophy, something he elaborated on in The Complex Vision (1920), his first full-length work of popular philosophy. He also published three collections of poetry between 1916 and 1922.

Politically, Powys described himself as an anarchist and was both anti-fascist and anti-Stalinist: "Powys already regarded fascism and Stalinism as appalling, but different, totalitarian regimes".

It was not until 1929, with his novel Wolf Solent, that Powys achieved any critical or financial success. In 1930 Powys and Phyllis moved from Greenwich Village in New York City to Hillsdale in rural upstate New York. One of Powys's most acclaimed novels, A Glastonbury Romance, published in 1932, sold well; however, he made little if any money from it due to a libel lawsuit. Another important work, Autobiography, was published in 1934.

=== Settling in Wales ===
Then in June 1934 Powys and Phyllis left America and moved to England, living first in Dorchester, the setting for the final Wessex novel, Maiden Castle, before eventually moving in July 1935 to Corwen, Denbighshire North Wales, with the help of novelist James Hanley, who lived nearby. Corwen was historically part of Edeirnion (or Edeyrnion) and an ancient commote of medieval Wales, once a part of the Kingdom of Powys. There, Powys immersed himself in Welsh literature, mythology and culture, including learning to read Welsh. The move inspired two major historical novels with Welsh settings, Owen Glendower (1941) and Porius (1951).

Margaret Powys died in 1947, and his son Littleton Alfred died in 1954.

In May 1955 they moved, finally, to Blaenau Ffestiniog in North Wales. John Cowper Powys died in 1963, and Phyllis Playter died in 1982.

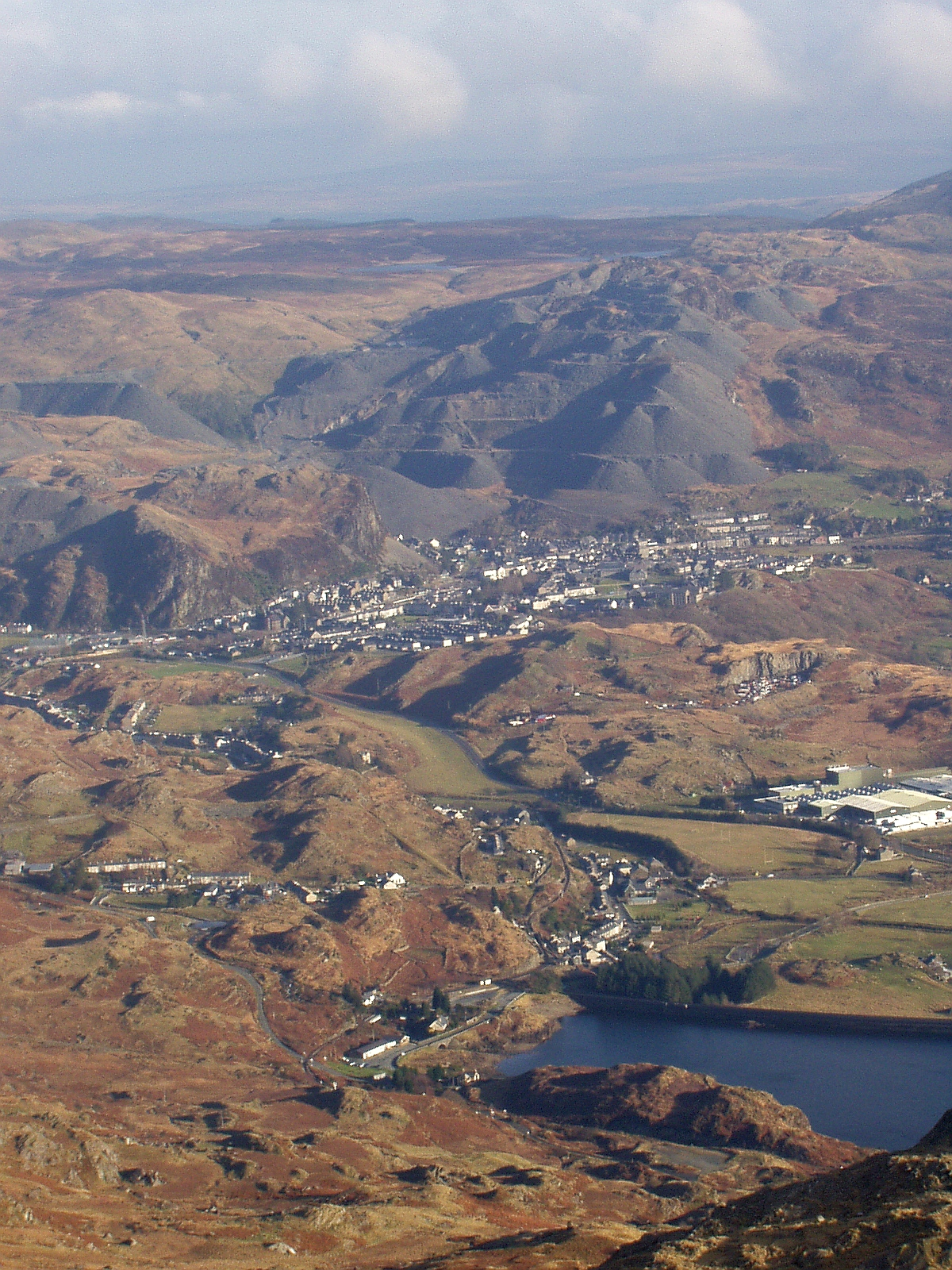
Blaenau Ffestiniog, where Powys lived from 1955 until he died in 1963

== Works ==
=== Poetry ===
Powys's first published works were poetry: Odes and Other Poems (1896), Poems (1899), collections with "echoes […] of Tennyson, Arnold, Swinburne, among contemporaries, and of Milton and Wordsworth and Keats". These were published with the assistance of his cousin Ralph Shirley, a director of William Rider, and their publisher, Son. In the summer of 1905 Powys composed "The Death of God", an epic poem "modelled on the blank verse of Milton, Keats, and Tennyson" that was published as Lucifer in 1956. There were three further volumes of poetry: Wolf's Bane (1916), Mandragora (1917) and Samphire (1922). The first two collections were published by Powys's manager, G. Arnold Shaw. An unfinished, short narrative poem "The Ridge" was published in January 1963, shortly before Powys's death that June. In 1964 Kenneth Hopkins published John Cowper Powys: A Selection from his Poems, and in 1979 the Welsh poet and critic Roland Mathias thought this side of Powys worthy of critical study and so published The Hollowed-Out Elder Stalk: John Cowper Powys as Poet. Belinda Humfrey suggests that "[p]erhaps Powys's best poems are those given to Jason Otter in Wolf Solent and Taliessin in Porius."

The Oxford Book of Twentieth Century English Verse (1973) edited by English poet Philip Larkin contains "In A Hotel Writing-Room" by Powys.

=== Novels ===
==== Wessex novels ====
While he was a famous lecturer and published a variety of both fiction and non-fiction regularly from 1915, it was not until his early fifties, with the publication of Wolf Solent in 1929, that he achieved critical and financial success as a novelist. This novel was reprinted several times in both the United States and Britain; it was translated into German in 1930 and French in 1931. In the Preface he wrote for the 1961 Macdonald edition of the novel, Powys states: "Wolf Solent is a book of Nostalgia, written in a foreign country with the pen of a traveller and the ink-blood of his home". Wolf Solent is set in Ramsgard, based on Sherborne, Dorset, where Powys attended school, as well as Blacksod, which is modelled on Yeovil, Somerset. Other settings are Dorchester and Weymouth, both in Dorset. These are all places full of memories for Powys. In the same year, The Meaning of Culture was published; it too was frequently reprinted. Another best-seller, In Defence of Sensuality, published at the end of the following year. First published in 1933, A Philosophy of Solitude was yet another best-seller for Powys in the United States.

Before Wolf Solent there had been four earlier apprentice novels: Wood and Stone (1915), Rodmoor (1916), the posthumous After my Fashion (1980), which was written around 1920, and Ducdame (1925). Wolf Solent was the first of the so-called Wessex novels, which include A Glastonbury Romance (1932), Weymouth Sands (1934) and Maiden Castle (1936). Powys was an admirer of Thomas Hardy, and these novels are set in Somerset and Dorset, parts of Hardy's mythical Wessex. The American scholar Richard Maxwell described these four novels "as remarkably successful with the reading public of his time". Maiden Castle, the last of the Wessex novels, is set in Dorchester, Thomas Hardy's Casterbridge. Powys intended it to be a rival of Hardy's The Mayor of Casterbridge.

All the same, despite his indebtedness to the Victorian novel and his enthusiasm for Hardy, Walter Scott and such lesser figures as Ainsworth, Powys was clearly a modernist. He has affinities also with Fyodor Dostoevsky, Friedrich Nietzsche, Walter Pater, Marcel Proust, Carl Jung, Sigmund Freud, D. H. Lawrence, James Joyce and Dorothy Richardson.

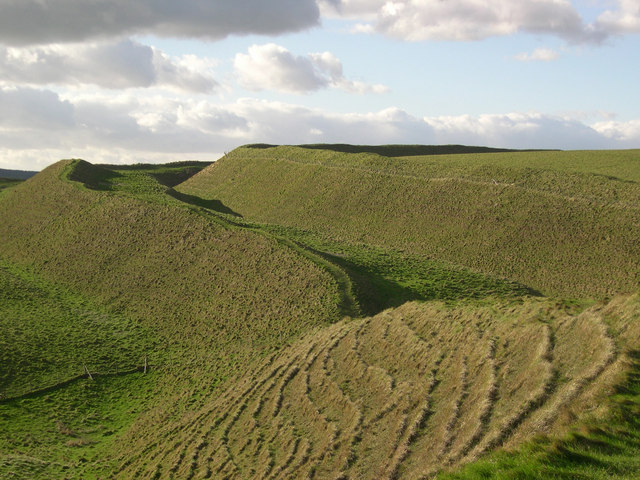
Maiden Castle, Dorset hill fort has an important role in Powys's novel Maiden Castle

It is clear from Powys's diaries that his new-found success was much helped by the stability that his relationship with Phyllis Playter gave him and her frequent advice on his work in progress. So much so that with regard to Weymouth Sands Powys believed "she ought to have her name on this book".

A Glastonbury Romance sold particularly well in its British edition, though this was of little avail as it was the subject of an expensive libel case brought by Gerard Hodgkinson, the owner of the Wookey Hole Caves, who felt himself identifiably and unfairly portrayed in the character of Philip Crow. According to Powys, this novel's "heroine is the Grail", and its central concern is with the various myths, legends and history associated with Glastonbury. Not only is A Glastonbury Romance concerned with the legend that Joseph of Arimathea brought the Grail, a vessel containing the blood of Christ, to the town, but the further tradition that King Arthur was buried there. Furthermore one of the novel's main characters, the Welshman Owen Evans, introduces the idea that the Grail has a Welsh (Celtic), pagan, pre-Christian origin. The main sources for Powys's ideas on mythology and the Grail legend are Sir John Rhys's Studies in the Arthurian Legend, R. S. Loomis's Celtic Myth and Arthurian Romance, and the works of Jessie Weston, including From Ritual to Romance. T. S. Eliot's The Waste Land is another possible influence. A central aspect of A Glastonbury Romance is the attempt by John Geard, an ex-minister now the Mayor of Glastonbury, to restore Glastonbury to its medieval glory as a place of religious pilgrimage. On the other hand, the Glastonbury industrialist Philip Crow, along with John and Mary Crow and Tom Barter, who are, like him, from Norfolk, view the myths and legends of the town with contempt. Philip's vision is of a future with more mines and more factories. John Crow, however, as he is penniless, takes on the task of organising a pageant for Geard. At the same time an alliance of Anarchists, Marxists, and Jacobins try to turn Glastonbury into a commune.

==== Welsh novels ====
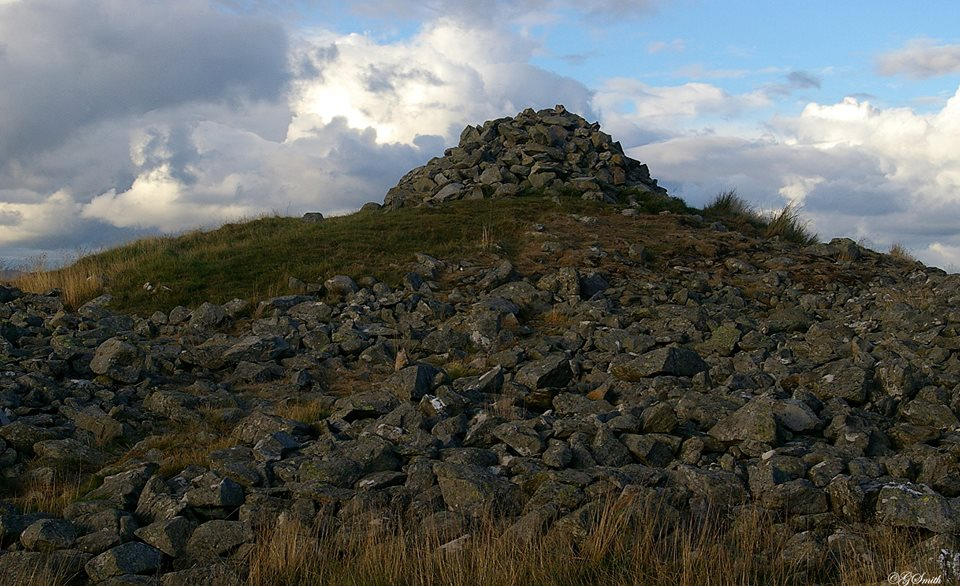
Caer Drewyn, Corwen, locally known as Mynydd-y-Gaer, the hill fort where Powys completed Owen Glendower on 24 December 1939. It is also an important setting in Porius.

While Welsh mythology was already important in A Glastonbury Romance and Maiden Castle it became still more so after he and Phyllis Playter moved to Corwen, Wales, in 1935, first in the minor novel Morwyn or The Vengeance of God (1937). Another important element in Morwyn, is condemnation of animal cruelty, especially vivisection, a theme also found in Weymouth Sands (1934). As a result, some writers have seen Powys as a forebear of the modern animal rights movement. In 1944, Powys wrote an anti-vivisection article for Leo Rodenhurst's The Abolitionist, a paper published by the British Union for the Abolition of Vivisection. Powys was also associated with the National Anti-Vivisection Society, where he met Evalyn Westacott, author of A Century of Vivisection and Anti-Vivisection (1949), who cited Powys arguments against vivisection, which Powys came to see as the worst of all crimes. He was a vegetarian.

There then followed two major historical novels set in Wales, Owen Glendower (1941) and Porius (1951). The first deals with the rebellion of the Welsh Prince Owain Glyndŵr (1400–1416 CE), while Porius takes place in the time of the mythic King Arthur (499 CE). However, Arthur is a minor character compared with the Welsh Prince Porius and the King's magician Myrddin (Merlin). In both works, but especially Porius, Powys makes use of the mythology found in the Welsh classic The Mabinogion. Porius is, for some, the crowning achievement of Powys's maturity, but others are repelled by its obscurity. It was originally cut severely for publication, but in recent years two attempts have been made to recreate Powys's original intent.

It is not surprising that John Cowper Powys, after he moved to Corwen, decided to begin a novel about Owain Glyndŵr, as it was in Corwen that Glyndŵr's rebellion against Henry IV began on 16 September 1400, when he formally assumed the ancestral title of Prince of Powys at his manor house of Glyndyfrdwy, then in the parish of Corwen. In September 1935, Phyllis Playter had suggested he should write a historical novel about Owain Glyndŵr. An important aspect of Owen Glendower are historical parallels between the beginning of the 15th century and the late 1930s and early 1940s: "A sense of contemporataneousness is ever present in Owen Glendower. We are in a world of change like our own". The novel was conceived at a time when the "Spanish Civil War (Note: On the April 26, 1937, two days after Powys began his novel, the Spanish town of Guernica, was bombed by the Nazi Germany's Luftwaffe. It inspired the painting Guernica by Pablo Picasso.) was a major topic of public debate" and completed on 24 December 1939, a few months after World War II had begun.

Porius is set mainly in Corwen. The events take place in the week of "October 18, to October 25, A.D. 499", during a historical period when, Powys claims, "There appears to be an absolute blank, as far as documentary evidence goes, with regard to the history of Britain". This was in fact a time of major transition in the history of Britain, with the replacing of Roman traditions with Saxon rule and the conversion of the British to Christianity. There are again, as with Owen Glendower, parallels with contemporary history: "The Dark Ages and the 1930s are the periods of what Powys, in Yeatsian phrase calls 'appalling transition'." and there was a clear possibility of another "Saxon" invasion, when Powys began writing Porius in 1942. In prefatory comments probably written about 1949, as the Cold War began, Powys suggests:

As we contemplate the historic background to [...] the last year of the fifth century [sic], it is impossible not to think of the background of human life from which we watch the first half of the twentieth century dissolve into the second half. As the old gods were departing then, so the old gods are departing now. And as the future was dark with the terrifying possibilities of human disaster then, so, today, are we confronted by the possibility of catastrophic world events.

Powys also saw Glyndŵr's rebellion taking place at the time of "one of the most momentous and startling epochs of transition that the world has known".

Just as the landscape of Dorset and Somerset and the characters' deep personal relationships with it had been of importance in the great Wessex novels, so the landscape of Wales was now significant, especially that of the Corwen region.

The landscape and the intimate relations that characters have with the elements, including the sky, wind, plants, animals, and insects, have great significance in all Powys's works. These are linked to another major influence: Romanticism, especially William Wordsworth and writers influenced by Wordsworth such as Walter Pater. Powys also admired Goethe and Rousseau. Words such as mysticism and pantheism are sometimes used in discussing Powys's attitude to nature, but what he is concerned with is an ecstatic response to the natural world, epiphanies such as Wordsworth describes in his "Ode: Intimations of Immortality", with an important difference that Powys believes that the ecstasy of the young child can be retained by an adult who actively cultivates the power of the imagination. Some have compared this to Zen and such contemplative practices, and for Powys, and the protagonists of his novels who usually resemble him, the cultivation of a psycho-sensuous philosophy is as important as the Christian religion was for an earlier generation.

==== Late novels ====
More minor in scale, the novels that followed Porius are marked by elements of fantasy. The Inmates (1952) is set in a madhouse and explores Powys's interest in mental illness, but it is a work on which Powys failed to bestow sufficient "time and care". Glen Cavaliero, in John Cowper Powys: Novelist, describes the novels written after Porius as "the spontaneous fairy tales of a Rabelaisian surrealist enchanted with life", and finds Atlantis (1954) "the richest and most sustained" of them. Atlantis is set in the Homeric world. The protagonist is Nisos, the young son of Odysseus, who plans to voyage west from Ithaca over the drowned Atlantis. Powys final fiction, such as Up and Out (1957) and All or Nothing (1960) "use the mode of science fiction, although science has no part in them".

=== Non-fiction ===
==== Autobiographical ====
One of Powys's most important works, his Autobiography (1934), describes his first 60 years. While he sets out to be totally frank about himself, and especially his sexual peculiarities and perversions, he largely excludes any substantial discussion of the women in his life. The reason for this is now much clearer because we now know that it was written while he was still married to Margaret, though he was living in a permanent relationship with Phyllis Playter.

It is one of his most important works and writer J. B. Priestley suggests that, even if Powys had not written a single novel, "this one book alone would have proved him to be a writer of genius." And it "has justly been compared to the Confessions of Jean-Jacques Rousseau.

John Cowper Powys was a prolific writer of letters, many of which have been published, and kept a diary from 1929; several diaries, including this one, have been published. Among his correspondents were the novelists Theodore Dreiser, James Purdy, James Hanley, Henry Miller and Dorothy Richardson, but he also replied to the many ordinary admirers who wrote to him.

==== Philosophy ====
Periodically, over almost 50 years, starting with Confessions of Two Brothers in 1916, Powys wrote works that present his personal philosophy of life. These are not works of philosophy in the academic sense; in a bookstore the appropriate section might be self-help. Powys describes A Philosophy of Solitude (1933) as a "short textbook of the various mental tricks by which the human soul can obtain […] comparative happiness beneath the normal burden of human fate". Powys's various works of popular philosophy may seem mere potboilers, written to help his finances as he worked on his novels, but critics like Denis Lane, Harald Fawkner and Janina Nordius see in them insight into "the intellectual structures that form the metastructures of the great novels". These works were frequently bestsellers, especially in the United States. The Meaning of Culture (1929) went through 20 editions in Powys's lifetime. In Defence of Sensuality, published at the end of the following year, was yet another bestseller, as was A Philosophy of Solitude (1933).

==== Literary criticism ====
Taking advantage of his reputation as an itinerant lecturer, Powys published in 1915 a collection of literary essays, Visions and Revisions. This was published by the manager of his lecture tours, Arnold Shaw, as were the subsequent Suspended Judgements: Essays on Books and Sensations (1916) and One Hundred Best Books (1916). Visions and Revisions went through four impressions in 16 months. In the next 30 years he published essay collection, The Enjoyment of Literature (1938) (The Pleasures of Literature in the UK), three studies of writers, Dorothy Richardson (1931), Dostoievsky (1947), and Rabelais (1948), and journal essays on various writers such as Theodore Dreiser, Marcel Proust, James Joyce, and D. H. Lawrence. There is also a work on John Keats, part of which was published posthumously, and a study of Aristophanes that Powys was working on in his later years.

Powys's literary criticism was generally well received by reviewers. Morine Krissdottir in her recent biography describes the essays in Suspended Judgements as "fine criticism". As for The Pleasures of Literature, the writer Kenneth Hopkins states that "[i]f ever there was a book of criticism for the general reader, this is it." In the 1940s Powys wrote books on two of his favourite authors: Dostoievsky (1946) and Rabelais (1948). The latter was particularly praised by some reviewers. The Rabelais scholar Donald M. Frame, for example, in the Romantic Review, December 1951, describes Powys's translation (only of one fourth of Rabelais) "the best we have in English". A French translation of Rabelais, by Catherine Lieutenant, was published in 1990.

=== Reputation ===
Powys is a controversial writer, "who evokes both massive contempt and near idolatry." While Walter Allen in Tradition and Dream recognises Powys's genius, he is dissatisfied with what Powys has done with it, seeing his approach to the novel as "so alien to the temper of the age as to be impossible for many people to take seriously". Yet Annie Dillard sees Powys as "a powerful genius, whose novels stir us deeply." Notable throughout his career is the admiration of novelists as diverse as Theodore Dreiser, Henry Miller, Iris Murdoch, Margaret Drabble, James Purdy, and the academic critics George Painter, G. Wilson Knight, George Steiner, Harald Fawkner and Jerome McGann. The film director John Boorman wrote in his autobiography of contemplating a movie adaptation of A Glastonbury Romance early in his career.

In 1958, "Powys was presented with the Bronze Plaque of the Hamburg Free Academy of Arts in recognition of his outstanding services to literature and philosophy". Then on 23 July 1962, aged 90, he gained an honorary degree of Doctor of Letters in absentia from the University of Wales at Swansea, as "patriarch of the literature of these islands". He was nominated for the Nobel Prize in Literature by Enid Starkie in 1958 and by G. Wilson Knight in 1959 and 1962.

Powys's works have been translated into French, German, Swedish, Japanese, and other languages.

== Bibliography ==
=== Internet Archive ===
Numerous books, etc. by, or about Powys, can be read online at "John Cowper Powys" Internet Archive

=== Novels ===
- Wood and Stone (1915) online text
- Rodmoor (1916) online text
- After My Fashion (written 1919, published 1980)
- Ducdame (1925)
- Wolf Solent (1929) online text
- A Glastonbury Romance (1933) online text of the 1934, 5th UK impression. This is a cut version, but less so than later editions.
- Weymouth Sands (1934) online text
- Jobber Skald (heavily edited version of the above for UK market, 1935).
- Maiden Castle (1936) Overlook edition available at
- Morwyn: or The Vengeance of God (1937)
- Owen Glendower. New York, [1941] available at
- Porius: A Romance of the Dark Ages (1951), restored texts 1994 and 2007. Two versions available at
- The Inmates (1952)
- Atlantis (1954)
- The Brazen Head (1956)
- Up and Out (two novellas, 1957)
- Homer and the Aether (1959)
- All or Nothing (1960)
- Real Wraiths (novella, 1974)
- Two and Two (novella, 1974)
- You and Me (novella, 1975)
- Three Fantasies. Manchester: Carcanet, 1985.

=== Short stories ===
- The Owl, The Duck, and – Miss Rowe! Miss Rowe! (1930)
- Romer Mowl and Other Stories (collection published 1974)
- Three Fantasies (collection published 1985)
  - Abertackle
  - Cataclysm
  - Topsy-Turvy

=== Philosophy ===
- The War and Culture (1914)
- The Complex Vision (1920): Project Gutenberg
- Psychoanalysis and Morality (1923). available at
- The Religion of a Sceptic (1925)
- The Meaning of Culture (1929)
- In Defence of Sensuality (1930) available at
- A Philosophy of Solitude (1933) available at
- The Art of Happiness (1935) available at
- Mortal Strife (1942)
- The Art of Growing Old (1944)
- In Spite of: A Philosophy for Everyman (1953) available at

=== Literary criticism and essays ===
- Visions and Revisions (1915) Online text
- Suspended Judgements (1916): Project Gutenberg
- One Hundred Best Books (1916): Project Gutenberg
- Dorothy Richardson (London: Joiner, 1931)
- The Enjoyment of Literature (1938; revised British version: The Pleasures of Literature
- Dostoievsky (London: John Lane The Bodley Head, 1946)
- Obstinate Cymric: Essays 1935–47 (1947)
- Rabelais (1948)

=== Poetry ===
- Odes and Other Poems (1896)
- Poems 1899
- Wolf's Bane: Rhymes (1916) Online
- Mandragora: Poems (1917) Online text
- Samphire (1922) Online text
- Lucifer: A Poem (Written:1905, Published: 1956)
- John Cowper Powys: A Selection from His Poems, ed. Kenneth Hopkins. London: Macdonald, 1964

=== Plays ===
- Paddock Calls, with "Introduction" by Charles Lock. London: Greymitre Books, 1984

=== Autobiographical ===
- Confessions of Two Brothers (with Llewelyn Powys) (1916)
- Autobiography (1934)

==== Diaries ====
- The Diary of John Cowper Powys for 1929, ed. Anthony Head. London: Cecil Woolf, 1998
- The Diary of John Cowper Powys 1930, ed. Frederick Davies (1987)
- The Diary of John Cowper Powys 1931 (editor unnamed but published by Jeffrey Kwintner) (1990)
- Petrushka and the Dancer: The Diaries of John Cowper Powys 1929–1939, ed. Morine Krissdóttir (1995)
- 1939 Diary ms, National Library of Wales, available online:

==== Letters ====
- Letters of John Cowper Powys to Louis Wilkinson 1935–1956 (1958)
- Letters of John Cowper Powys to His Brother Llewelyn, ed. Malcolm Elwin. 2 vols., (1975)
- Jack and Frances: The Love Letters of John Cowper Powys to Frances Gregg 2 vols., ed. Oliver Wilkinson, assisted by Christopher Wilkinson (1994)
- Powys and Dorothy Richardson: Letters of John Cowper Powys and Dorothy Richardson, ed. Janet Fouli (2008)
- Powys and Emma Goldman: Letters of John Cowper Powys and Emma Goldman, ed. David Goodway (2008)
- John Cowper Powys: Letters to Nicholas Ross (selected by Nicholas and Adelaide Ross), ed. Arthur Uphill (1971)
- Powys to Sea Eagle: Letters of John Cowper Powys to Philipa Powys, ed. Anthony Head (1996)
- Letters to Henry Miller from John Cowper Powys (1975) and Proteus and the Magician: The Letters of Henry Miller and John Cowper Powys, ed. Jacqueline Peltier. London: The Powys Society, 2014 (This contains letters by both men.)
- Powys to Knight: Letters of John Cowper Powys to G. R. Wilson Knight, ed. Robert Blackmore (1983)
- John Cowper Powys: Letters 1937–54, ed. Iorwerth C. Peate, (1974)
- The Correspondence of James Purdy and John Cowper Powys 1956–1963, edited with an introduction by Michael Ballin and Charles Lock. Powys Journal, Vol. XXIII (August 2013)

=== Biography and critical studies ===
- Cavaliero, Glen. John Cowper Powys, Novelist
- Coates, C.A. John Cowper Powys in Search of a Landscape. Totowa, NJ: Barnes and Noble, 1982
- David Goodway, Anarchist Seeds beneath the Snow: Left-Libertarian Thought and British Writers from William Morris to Colin Ward. PM Press, 2011 (two chapters on Powys)
- Graves, Richard Perceval. The Brothers Powys (1983)
- Hooker, Jeremy. John Cowper Powys. Cardiff (1973)
- Humfrey, Belinda, ed.The Powys Review. Index to critical articles and other material:
- Knight, G. Wilson. The Saturnian Quest
- Krissdottir, Morine. Descents of Memory: The Life of John Cowper Powys. New York: Overlook Duckworth, 2007
- Lane, Denis, ed. In the Spirit of Powys: New Essays. New York (1990)
- Miller, Henry. The Immortal Bard. London: Village Press, 1973. (pamphlet, print run of 500 copies)
- Nordius, Janina. I Am Myself Alone: Solitude and Transcendence in John Cowper Powys
- Peltier, Jacqueline, ed. la lettre powysienne. Index to critical articles and other material:
- Williams, Herbert. John Cowper Powys. (1997)

=== Bibliographical ===
- Langridge, Derek. John Cowper Powys: A Record of Achievement (1966)
- Thomas, Dante. A Bibliography of the Principal Writings of John Cowper Powys, Ph.D, State University of New York, at Albany, 1971. Published as A Bibliography of the Writings of John Cowper Powys. Mamaroneck, NY: Appel, 1975.
