= T. F. Powys =

British novelist and short story writer

Theodore Francis Powys
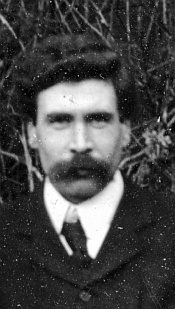
- Born: 20 December 1875; Shirley, Derbyshire, England
- Died: 27 November 1953 (aged 77); Mappowder, Dorset, England
- Resting place: Mappowder, Dorset
- Occupations: Novelist and short story writer
- Spouse: Violet Dodd
- Writing career
- Genre: Allegory
- Notable works: Mr. Weston's Good Wine, Unclay
- Literary movement: Modernism, English literature

Theodore Francis Powys (20 December 1875 – 27 November 1953) – published as T. F. Powys – was a British novelist and short-story writer. He is best remembered for his allegorical novel Mr. Weston's Good Wine (1927), where Weston the wine merchant is evidently God. Powys's writings were influenced by the Bible, John Bunyan, Jonathan Swift and other writers of the 17th and 18th centuries, as well as later writers such as Thomas Hardy and Friedrich Nietzsche.

== Biography ==
Powys was born in Shirley, Derbyshire, the son of the Reverend Charles Francis Powys (1843–1923), vicar of Montacute, Somerset, for 32 years, and Mary Cowper Johnson, grand-daughter of Dr John Johnson, cousin and close friend of the poet William Cowper. He was one of eleven talented siblings, including the novelist John Cowper Powys (1872–1963) and the novelist and essayist Llewelyn Powys (1884–1939). Their sister Philippa Powys also published a novel and some poetry, while Marian Powys was an authority on lace and lace-making and published a book on this subject. Gertrude Powys was a painter. Another brother, A. R. Powys, was secretary of the Society for the Protection of Ancient Buildings and published a number of books on architectural subjects.

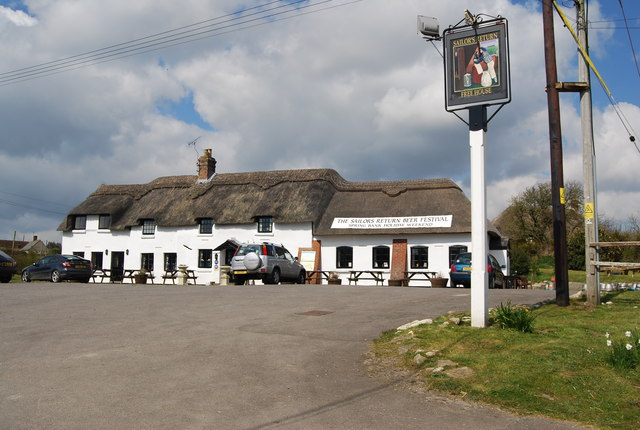
Sailors return, East Chaldon. Powys lived in East Chaldon from 1904 to 1940.

A sensitive child, Powys was not happy in school and left when he was 15 to become an apprentice on a farm in Suffolk. Later he had his own farm in Suffolk, but he was not successful and returned to Dorset in 1901 with plans to be a writer. Then, in 1905, he married Violet Dodd. They had two sons and later adopted a daughter. From 1904 until 1940 Theodore Powys lived in East Chaldon but then moved to Mappowder because of the Second World War.

During the Spanish Civil War (1936–39), Powys was one of several UK writers who campaigned for aid to be sent to the Republican side.

The novels Mr. Weston's Good Wine (1927) and Unclay (1931) and the short-story collection Fables are most praised, while his early non-fiction work The Soliloquy of a Hermit (1916) also has its admirers. Powys was deeply, if unconventionally, religious; the Bible was a major influence, and he had a special affinity with writers of the 17th and 18th centuries, including John Bunyan, Miguel de Cervantes, Jeremy Taylor, Jonathan Swift, and Henry Fielding. Among more recent writers, he admired Thomas Hardy, Sigmund Freud, and Friedrich Nietzsche. Powys has been described by C. N. Manlove as one of the three main writers – along with C. S. Lewis and Charles Williams – of "Christian fantasy" in the 20th century.

He died on 27 November 1953 in Mappowder, Dorset, where he was buried.

== Bibliography ==
=== Non-fiction ===
- An Interpretation of Genesis. N.p.: Privately printed,1907.
- The Soliloquy of a Hermit. New York: G. Arnold Shaw, 1916 (Soliloquies of a Hermit 1918). Available online

=== Novels ===
- Black Bryony. London: Chatto and Windus, 1923; New York: Knopf, 1923.
- Mark Only. London: Chatto and Windus, 1924; New York: Knopf, 1924.
- Mr Tasker's Gods. London: Chatto and Windus, 1925; New York: Knopf, 1925.
- Mockery Gap. London: Chatto and Windus, 1925; New York: Knopf, 1925.
- Mr. Weston's Good Wine. London: Chatto and Windus, 1927; New York: Viking, 1927.
- Kindness in a Corner. London : Chatto and Windus, 1930; New York: Viking, 1930.
- Unclay. London: Chatto and Windus, 1931; New York: Viking, 1932.
- The Market Bell, edited with notes by Ian Robinson, assisted by Elaine Mencher; with an afterword by J. Lawrence Mitchell. Doncaster, South Yorkshire : Brynmill Press, 1991.

=== Story collections ===
(including novellas)

- The Left Leg. London: Chatto and Windus, 1923; New York: Knopf, 1923. Available online
- Innocent Birds. London: Chatto and Windus, 1926; New York: Knopf, 1926.
- The House With the Echo: Twenty-six Stories. London: Chatto and Windus, 1928; New York: Viking, 1928.
- Fables. New York: Viking, 1929; London: Chatto and Windus, 1929 (No Painted Plumage, 1934).
- The White Paternoster, and Other Stories. London, Chatto & Windus, 1930; New York: Viking,1931.
- The Key of the Field. London: William Jackson (Books) Ltd, 1930.
- The Only Penitent. London, Chatto & Windus, 1931 (The Dolphin Books series).
- The Two Thieves (containing "In Good Earth", "God", "The Two Thieves"). London: Chatto and Windus, 1932; New York: Viking, 1933.
- Captain Patch: Twenty-one Stories. London: Chatto and Windus, 1935.
- Bottle's Path, and Other Stories. London: Chatto and Windus, 1946.
- God's Eyes A-Twinkle (an anthology of the stories of T. F. Powys, with a preface by Charles Prentice). London, Chatto & Windus, 1947.
- Rosie Plum, and Other Stories, ed. F. Powys. London, Chatto & Windus, 1966.
- Come Dine, and Tadnol, ed. A. P. Riley. Hastings: R.A. Brimmell, 1967
- Father Adam. Doncaster: Brynmill, 1990.
- Mock's Curse: Nineteen Stories, selected and edited by Elaine & Barrie Mencher. Norfolk: Brynmill, 1995.
- The Sixpenny Strumpet (with tales from The Two Thieves). Harleston: Brynmill, 1997.
- Selected Early Works of T. F. Powys. Brynmill Press, 2003.

In addition some single stories were also published as books during the 1920s and 1930s.

== Theses ==
- Steinmann, Martin. T. F. Powys: A Thematic Study. Univ. of Minnesota., 1954. Ph.D Thesis.
- Goldring, Frances J. T. F. Powys as an Allegorical Novelist. Dalhousie University, Dept. of English, 1969. M.A. Thesis.
- Hoffman, David Edwin. A Comparative Study of J. C. Powys, T. F. Powys and Llewelyn Powys, with Special Reference to the Influence of Their Private Religions in Their Literary Work. King's College, London, Department of English, 1958. M.A. Thesis.

== Articles and discussion ==
- Allen, Walter Ernest. The Short Story in English. Oxford and New York: Oxford University Press, 1981.
- Cavaliero, Glen. The Rural Tradition in the English Novel, 1900–1939. London and New York: Macmillan, 1977.
- ———. The Alchemy of Laughter: Comedy in English Fiction. Houndmills, Basingstoke, Hampshire: Macmillan Press; New York: St. Martin's Press, 2000.
- Gunnell, B. "T. F. Powys's Unclay, or the Unconditional Gift". Durham University Journal 85:1 (1993), 95.
- Holbrook, David. "Two Welsh Writers: T. F. Powys and Dylan Thomas". In Boris Ford, ed., The Modern Age, vol. 7 of The Pelican Guide to English Literature. London: Penguin, 1964.
- Van Kranendonk, A. G. '"T. F. Powys". English Studies 26:1 (1944), 97–107.
- Rogers, John Headley. British Short-Fiction Writers, 1915–1945. British short-fiction writers, 1915–1945 [electronic resource] / John Headley Rogers, editor. Detroit, Mich.: Gale Research, 1996.
- Steinmann, Martin. "Water and Animal Symbolism in T. F. Powys". English Studies 41:1 (1960), 359–365.
- See also The Powys Review, The Powys Journal, La letter powysienne , and Powys Notes for further articles, etc.

== Archives ==
- Harry Ransom Center, Theodore Francis Powys Collection.
- Dorset Museum, Dorchester, Correspondence and literary papers.
- British Library. Letters to Vera Wainwright, Add. MS 54330.
- London University Library. Letters to Charles Lahr and literary mss.
- National Library of Wales. Letters to John Cowper Powys.
- University of Aberdeen Library. Letters to J. B. Chapman.

The Powys Society's website has a comprehensive list of archives.
