= Llewelyn Powys =

English novelist

- Born: 13 August 1884; Dorchester, Dorset, England
- Died: 2 December 1939 (aged 55); Clavadel, Switzerland
- Education: Sherborne School
- Alma mater: Corpus Christi College, Cambridge
- Occupations: Essayist, novelist
- Spouse: Alyse Gregory (m. 1924)
- Relatives: John Johnson (great-grandfather); John Cowper Powys (brother); Theodore Francis Powys (brother); Philippa Powys (sister); Albert Powys (brother); Gertrude Mary Powys (sister)

Llewelyn Powys (13 August 1884 – 2 December 1939) was a British essayist, novelist and younger brother of John Cowper Powys and T. F. Powys.

== Family ==
Powys was born in Dorchester, the son of the Reverend Charles Francis Powys (1843–1923), who was vicar of Montacute, Somerset for thirty-two years, and Mary Cowper Johnson, a granddaughter of Dr John Johnson, the cousin and friend of the poet William Cowper.

He came from a family of eleven children, many of whom were also talented. Two brothers John Cowper Powys and Theodore Francis Powys were also well-known writers, while his sister Philippa published a novel and some poetry. Another sister, Marian Powys, was an authority on lace and lace-making and published a book on this subject. His brother A. R. Powys was Secretary of the Society for the Protection of Ancient Buildings, and published a number of books on architectural subjects.

== Life ==
He was educated at Sherborne School (1899–1903) and Corpus Christi College, Cambridge (1903–1906). While lecturing in the United States he contracted tuberculosis. After his return in 1909, he travelled again, living for a while in Switzerland. He spent time in Africa, farming with his brother William near Gilgil in British East Africa (now in Kenya) from 1914 to 1919.

In 1920 he went again to America to work as a journalist. While living in New York City he met and married, in 1924, the novelist Alyse Gregory (1884–1967), editor of the journal The Dial. In 1925 the couple moved to Dorset: firstly to the Coastguard Cottages on White Nothe and then to nearby farmhouse Chydyok, where his two sisters, the poet and novelist, Philippa Powys, and the artist, Gertrude Powys, occupied the adjacent cottage. This was close to the village of East Chaldon where his brother, the author Theodore Powys, lived from 1904 until 1940. Various other writers and artists lived in the village at different times, such as Sylvia Townsend Warner and David Garnett, the poets Valentine Ackland and Gamel Woolsey, and the sculptors Elizabeth Muntz and Stephen Tomlin.

Gamel Woolsey met John Cowper Powys when she lived in Patchin Place, Greenwich Village, and, through him, his brother Llewelyn and his wife, Alyse Gregory. She and Alyse became friends for life, while with Llewelyn she had a passionate and painful love affair. Woolsey left New York for England in 1929, settling in Dorset to be near Llewelyn, where she came to know the whole Powys family and their circle. Parting from Llewelyn in 1930, she married the historian and writer Gerald Brenan in a private ceremony, and they lived together, mainly in Spain, until her death.

Powys traveled with his wife, paying visits to Mandatory Palestine (1928), the West Indies (1930) and Switzerland (1937). He died in Clavadel, Switzerland from complications related to an ulcer.

His writings include a novel, Apples Be Ripe (1930), and a biography of Henry Hudson (1927). He was very friendly with Hamilton Rivers Pollock, Barrister, owner from 1928, of Urchfont Manor.

== Rationalism ==
Powys identified as a rationalist and humanist and wrote articles critical of religion in freethought journals such as the Rationalist Annual and The Literary Guide.

He was an atheist.

== Bibliography ==
=== Works ===
- Confessions of Two Brothers (1916)
- Ebony and Ivory (1923) short stories, sketches
- Thirteen Worthies (1923) essays
- Honey and Gall (1924) autobiography
- Black Laughter (1925)
- Cup-Bearers of Wine and Hellebore (1924)
- Skin for Skin (1925) autobiography
- The Verdict of Bridlegoose (1926)
- Henry Hudson (1927)
- Out of the Past (1928)
- The Cradle of God (1929)
- The Pathetic Fallacy (1930)
- An Hour on Christianity (1930)
- Apples Be Ripe (1930)
- A Pagan's Pilgrimage (1931)
- Impassioned Clay (1931)
- The Life and Times of Anthony à Wood (1932)
- Now That The Gods Are Dead (1932)
- Glory of Life (1934)
- Earth Memories (1935)
- Damnable Opinions (1935)
- Dorset Essays (1935)
- The Twelve Months (1936)
- How I Became and why I Remain a Rationalist (1937)
- Somerset Essays (1937)
- Rats in the Sacristy (1937)
- The Book of Days (1937)
- Love and Death (1939)
- A Baker's Dozen (1939)
- Old English Yuletide (1940)
- The Letters of Llewelyn Powys (1943) edited by Louis Wilkinson
- Swiss Essays (1947)
- Advice to a Young Man (1949)
- Llewelyn Powys: A Selection (1952) edited by Kenneth Hopkins
- So Wild a Thing: Letters to Gamel Woolsey (1973) edited by Malcolm Elwin

=== Critical studies ===
- Elwin, Malcolm (1946), The Life of Llewelyn Powys
- Graves, Richard Percival, The Powys Brothers (Oxford: Oxford University Press, 1984)
- Ward, Richard Heron (1936), The Powys Brothers
- Peter J. Foss (2007), A Bibliography of Llewelyn Powys
- Wilkinson, Louis (1943), The Letters of Llewelyn Powys
- Lee, Neil (2014),"Llewelyn Powys - The Man Behind the Myth" (New Age Poetry Press, 2014)
