= Albert Powys =

British architect (1881–1936)

Albert Reginald Powys
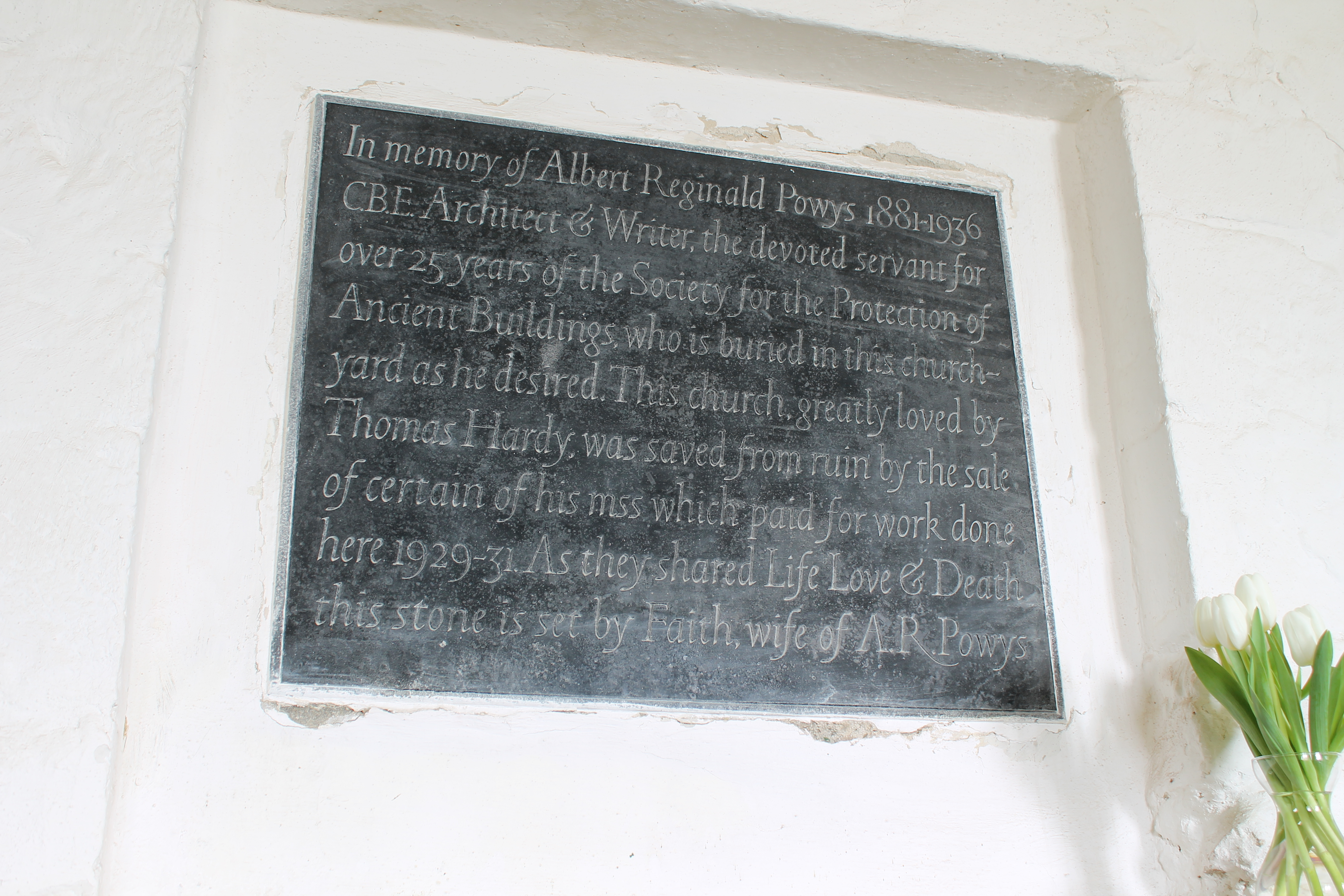
- Memorial plaque in the Church of St Andrew, Winterbourne Tomson
- Born: 16 July 1881; Dorchester, Dorset
- Died: 8 March 1936 (aged 54); Hindhead, Surrey
- Education: Sherborne School
- Occupation: Architect
- Parent(s): Reverend Charles Francis Powys & Mary Cowper Johnson
- Buildings: Godalming War Memorial; Leeds War Memorial
- Projects: Sissinghurst Castle Garden

Albert Reginald Powys CBE (16 July 1881 – 8 March 1936) was an architect and Secretary of the Society for the Protection of Ancient Buildings for some 25 years in the early 20th century.

== Life ==
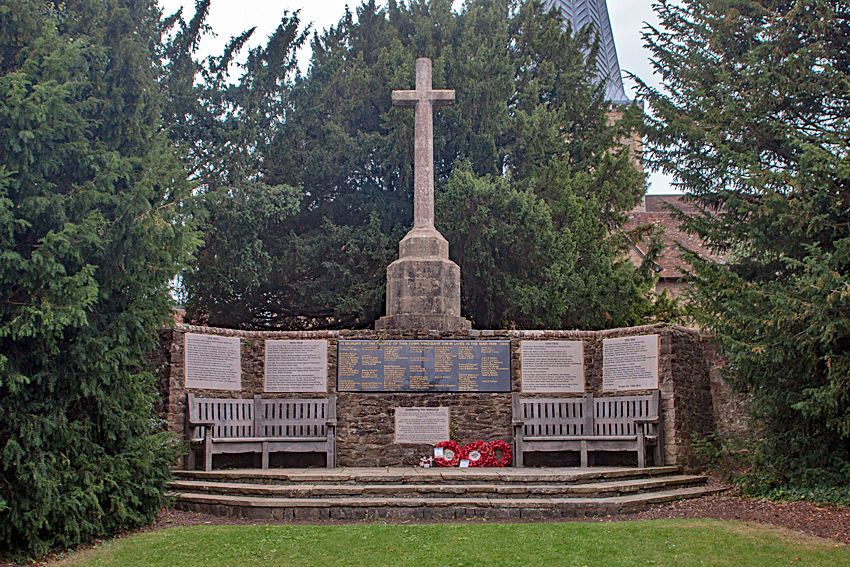
Godalming war memorial

Powys was born into a large and notable literary family in 1881. Siblings included John Cowper Powys, Llewelyn Powys, Theodore Francis Powys and Philippa Powys. Educated at Sherborne School and then trained as an architect, Powys also served as the Secretary of the Society for the Protection of Ancient buildings for twenty-five years. He wrote an influential study of conservation practice, Repair of Ancient Buildings, published in 1929. Among a number of restorations, he undertook much building and rebuilding at Sissinghurst Castle Garden for Vita Sackville-West and Harold Nicolson, where the Powys Wall in the Rose Garden was named in his honour.

He designed the Godalming war memorial, another memorial in Leeds and that at Blo' Norton in Norfolk. All three are Grade II listed.

Powys died in 1936 and is buried in the Church of St Andrew, Winterborne Tomson, Dorset, where a memorial plaque commemorates his life and his restoration of the church in 1931.
