= Philippa Powys =

British writer (1886–1963)

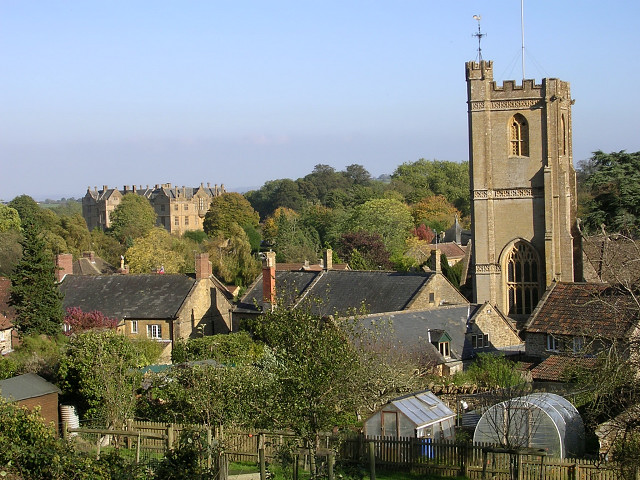
Village of Montacute, Somersetshire, where Philippa Powys was born

Catharine Edith Philippa Powys (/ˈpoʊ.ɪs/; 8 May 1886 – 11 January 1963) was a British novelist and poet, and a member of one of the most distinguished families in modern literature.

== Family ==
She was born at Montacute in Somerset, where her father Reverend Charles Francis Powys (1843–1923) was the vicar between 1885 and 1918. She received no formal education, and much of the knowledge she acquired in youth was self-discovered.

Among her brothers were the novelists John Cowper Powys and Theodore Francis Powys (1875–1953), and the novelist and essayist Llewelyn Powys, as well as Littleton Charles Powys (1874–1955), headmaster of Sherborne Prep School, and the architect A. R. Powys who was Secretary of the Society for the Protection of Ancient Buildings and published several books on architecture. Of her sisters, Gertrude Powys was a painter of striking portraits and powerful landscapes, Marian Powys an authority on lace and lace-making in the United States, where she emigrated. Philippa Powys was the ninth of eleven children in the Powys family's largest and most talented generation and was known to relatives and friends as 'Katie'.

Her early adult life was spent farming, but in a family of prodigious writers it was no surprise that her own creative energies were channelled into literature from an early age. Her brother John's letters to her have been published: Powys to Sea Eagle: Letters of John Cowper Powys to Philippa Powys, ed. Anthony Head. London: Cecil Woolf, 1996.

== Kindred spirits ==
In 1924 she moved into Chydyok, an isolated farmhouse near the majestic Dorset coastline, with her sister, the artist Gertrude Powys. A few years later her brother, Llewelyn Powys, and his wife, Alyse Gregory, joined them to occupy the adjacent cottage. A couple of miles inland, across whale-backed hills, lay the village of East Chaldon where another brother, Theodore (T.F) Powys, lived as well as the author Sylvia Townsend Warner and poet Valentine Ackland.

== Work ==
Despite never achieving the success of her literary brothers she wrote at least two novels at Chydyok, The Tragedy of Budvale and Joan Callais, as well as a play, The Quick and the Dead, but only the first of these has been published. Subsequent novels included The Path of the Gale and Further West, but these too never saw the light of day. In 1930, she had a collection of poems published titled Driftwood, and three short pamphlets of poems appeared thereafter (many of them republished in 1992 in Driftwood and Other Poems). That year also saw her only success as a novelist with The Blackthorn Winter, published by Constable in London and by Richard R. Smith in New York, and to be reissued for the first time in late January 2007 by The Sundial Press. She also kept a journal over several decades which is being edited. In 1957 Philippa Powys moved to the village of Buckland Newton in Dorset where she died six years later. Two previously unpublished novellas, Sorrel Barn and The Tragedy of Budvale, were published by Sundial Press in 2011.

Several articles on Philippa Powys have been published in The Powys Journal.
