= Osgod Clapa =

11th century nobleman

Osgod Clapa (died 1054), also Osgot, was a nobleman in Anglo-Saxon England during the reigns of Kings Cnut the Great, Harold Harefoot, Harthacnut, and Edward the Confessor. His name comes from the Old Danish Asgot, the byname Clapa perhaps meaning coarse, or rough, in Old Norse. He was a major landowner in East Anglia during a period in which no Ealdorman was appointed to the region. He held the post of staller, that is constable or master of the royal stables. In 1046 he was banished, and in 1054 he died.

Osgod is found as a witness to charters from 1026 onwards, but he first appears in narrative accounts on the occasion of the marriage of his daughter Gytha to his fellow-staller Tovi the Proud. It appears to be at these celebrations, on, or shortly before 8 June 1042, that King Harthacnut died suddenly.

Edward the Confessor kept Osgod in his position of trust, and the reasons for his eventual outlawing in late 1046 are far from clear. It may be that it was related to the earlier exile of Cnut's niece Gunnhild in 1044. Gunnhild was first married to Håkon Eiriksson, son of Cnut's trusted ally Eiríkr Hákonarson, and later to Earl Harald, son of Thorkell the Tall, a trusted servant of King Harthacnut, which placed her in a prominent position among opponents of Edward the Confessor's kingship. Osgod appears to have gone to Flanders, where Count Baldwin V gave him refuge.

In 1049 the Anglo-Saxon Chronicle reports that after King Edward had dispersed most of the fleet he had gathered to support the Holy Roman Emperor Henry III in his war against the Count of Flanders:

Then it was told the king that Osgod lay at Wulpen with thirty-nine ships; whereupon the king sent after the ships that he might dispatch, which before had gone homewards, but still lay at the Nore. Then Osgod fetched his wife from Bruges; and they went back again with six ships; but the rest went towards Essex, to The Naze, and there plundered, and then returned to their ships. But there came upon them a strong wind, so that they were all lost but four persons, who were afterwards slain beyond sea.

The Chronicle reports Osgod's death in 1054, "suddenly in his bed, as he lay at rest", apparently still in exile.
