= Culture of Dorset =

Culture of the English county

Dorset (or archaically Dorsetshire) is a county in South West England on the English Channel coast. The ceremonial county comprises the area covered by the non-metropolitan county, which is governed by Dorset Council, together with the unitary authorities of Poole and Bournemouth. Dorset is an average sized county with an area of 2,653 square kilometres (1,024 sq mi); it borders Devon to the west, Somerset to the north-west, Wiltshire to the north-east, and Hampshire to the east. Around half of Dorset's population lives in the South East Dorset conurbation. The rest of the county is largely rural with a low population density.

Dorset has a long history of human settlement and a rich culture. The county contains 1,500 scheduled monuments, including the Iron Age hillfort, Maiden Castle; and more than 12,000 listed buildings. It is famed in literature as the birthplace of Thomas Hardy and has been an inspiration to several authors including Enid Blyton who used the local landscape in many of her books. The local people have their own regional dialect which is still spoken in parts; and their own peculiar food, like the Dorset Knob, a hard biscuit, and Dorset Blue Vinney cheese. The county hosts many annual events and fairs including the Great Dorset Steam Fair near Blandford, purported to be the largest outdoor event in Europe; and The Dorset County Show, a celebration of Dorset's relationship with agriculture.

== Performing arts and music ==
As a largely rural county, Dorset has fewer major cultural institutions than larger or more densely populated areas. Major venues for concerts and theatre include Poole Borough Council's Lighthouse arts centre, Bournemouth's BIC and Pavilion Theatre, Verwood's Hub, Wimborne's Tivoli Theatre, and the Pavilion theatre in Weymouth. Dorset's most famous cultural institution is perhaps the Bournemouth Symphony Orchestra, founded in 1893 and now one of the country's most celebrated orchestras. Since 1974, Dorset Opera have been running a residential, opera summer school. An annual production at Bryanston School near Blandford has a chorus of 50–80 pupils performing alongside soloists of international repute, a full professional orchestra with an acclaimed conductor and director. In 2011 this turned into Dorset Opera Festival.

The Yetties were a folk music group who took their name from the Dorset village of Yetminster which was their childhood home. They drew on their personal experiences of country life for much of their material. Some of the songs they sang recalled what life was like when they were children helping the farmers at harvest time, scrumping when the farmers weren't looking, raiding the countryside for food and eating rabbit for practically every meal. Dorset is the birthplace of musicians John Eliot Gardiner, Greg Lake and Robert Fripp.

Dorset's dramatic coastline, countryside, manor houses and gardens have featured in a number films and television productions including, perhaps unsurprisingly, adaptations of The Mayor of Casterbridge, Tess of the D'Urbervilles and Far from the Madding Crowd. Lyme Regis was the home of author John Fowles and the 1980 film The French Lieutenant's Woman starring Meryl Streep and Jeremy Irons, based on his novel, was filmed there; the 2005 British fantasy film Nanny McPhee used the Isle of Purbeck as its setting; From Time to Time starring Dame Maggie Smith was filmed at Athelhampton House near Dorchester. Mapperton House and its gardens have been the setting for many period dramas such as the 1996 Emma, starring Gwyneth Paltrow, adapted, from Jane Austen's novel.

== Historic sites and museums ==
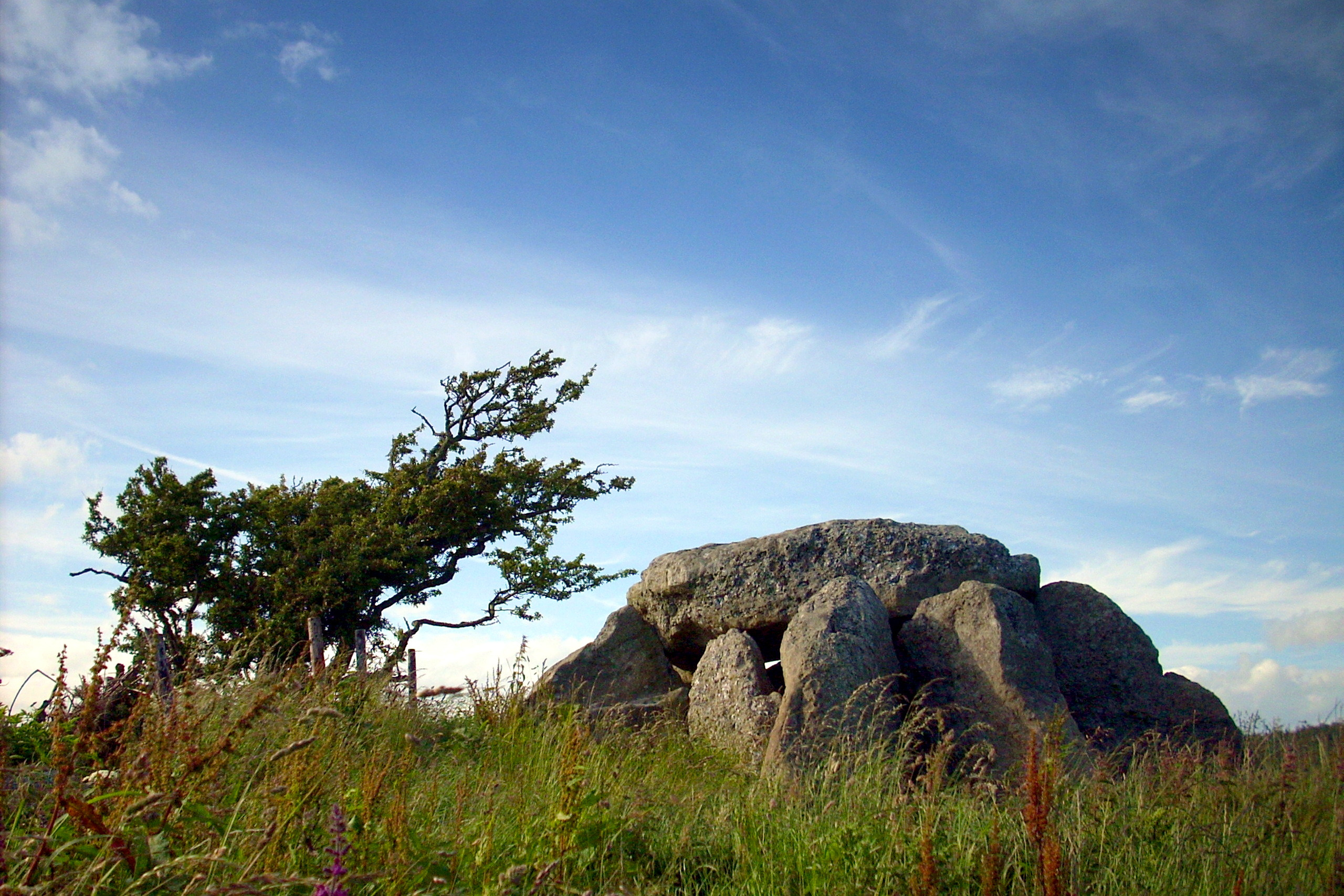
The Hellstone, near Portesham.

Dorset's history is celebrated in more than 30 general and specialist museums throughout the county. There are museums dedicated to fashion, plastic design, mineral extraction, water supply and electricity. In addition there is the internationally important Tank Museum at Bovington, and The Keep Military Museum, one of the top provincial military museums in the country. The Dorset County Museum, now the Dorset Museum, in Dorchester was founded in 1846 and contains an extensive collection of exhibits covering, amongst other things: the Jurassic Coast, local writers, archaeology, wildlife, geology and local history.

Dorset contains 190 conservation areas, over 30 listed parks and gardens, more than 1,500 scheduled monuments and 12,850 listed buildings; many of which—over 6,000—are in the west of the county. Of the 229 that are Grade I listed, 174 are churches or places of worship, from the longest church in England, Christchurch Priory, to one of the smallest, St Edwold's. Nine castles are listed: some were constructed as defensive fortresses such as Corfe, Portland and Christchurch Castle, others are mock castles such as Highcliffe and Lulworth.

The county has a long history of human settlement and some notable archaeology, such as the hill forts of Maiden Castle, Badbury Rings and Hod Hill. A large defensive ditch, Bokerley Dyke, delayed the Saxon conquest of Dorset for up to 150 years. There are numerous ancient burial sites and standing stones. Some of the more impressive include the stone circles at Kingston Russell, Hampton Down Stone Circle, Rempstone and Nine Stones near Winterbourne Abbas. Just north of Portesham is a huge Neolithic dolmen known as the Hell Stone consisting of nine upright stones and a capstone.

== Festivals and fairs ==
Dorset hosts a number of annual festivals, fairs and events including the Great Dorset Steam Fair near Blandford, purported to be the largest outdoor event in Europe, and the Bournemouth Air Festival, a free show that attracts 1.3 million visitors. The Spirit of the Sea Maritime Festival aims to combine sporting activities, cultural events and entertainments in a celebration of Weymouth and Portland's close ties with the sea. The Dorset County Show, which in 2011 will be in its 170th year, is a celebration of Dorset's relationship with agriculture. The two-day event showcases local produce and livestock and attracts some 55,000 people. In addition to the smaller folk festivals held in towns such as Christchurch and Wimborne, Dorset holds several larger musical events such as Camp Bestival, Endorse It (in Dorset), End of the Road and the Larmer Tree Festival.

== Local identity and cuisine ==
The Dorset dialect stems from the ancient Norse and Saxon languages and was preserved in the isolated Blackmore Vale until the arrival of the railways when the customs and language of London arrived. The rural dialect is still spoken in some villages and is kept alive in the poems of William Barnes and Robert Young.

The Dorset Knob is a hard, dry, savoury biscuit peculiar to the county. They are typically eaten with cheese such as Dorset Blue Vinney and are said to have been a favourite food of local author Thomas Hardy. A Dorset Knob throwing competition is held in the Dorset village of Cattistock every year on the first Sunday in May. The festival also includes such events as a knob and spoon race, knob darts, knob painting and guess the weight of the knob. Dorset Blue Vinney is a hard, crumbly cheese with a strong taste and smell. It is made with unpasteurised, skimmed milk. Historically the cream was removed to make butter which was highly regarded in London and carried a premium price. William Barnes asks for Blue Vinney cheese in his poem, 'Praise O' Do'set'. Since 1986 an annual nettle eating competition has been held in the village of Marshwood. It attracts nettle eaters from across the globe.

Dorset's flag, which is known as the Dorset Cross, was adopted in 2008 following a public competition organised by Dorset County Council. The winning design, which features a white cross with a red border on a golden background, attracted 54% of the vote. All three colours are used in Dorset County Council's coat of arms and the red and white was used in recognition of the English flag. The golden colour represents Dorset's sandy beaches and the Dorset landmarks of Golden Cap and Gold Hill. It is also a reference to the Wessex Dragon, a symbol of the Saxon Kingdom which Dorset once belonged to, and the gold wreath featured on the badge of the Dorset Regiment. The flag is often unofficially named St Wite's Cross after a Saxon holy woman buried in Whitchurch Canonicorum who was believed to have been martyred by invading Danes in the 9th century. Dorset's motto is 'Who's Afear'd'.

== Stories and legends ==
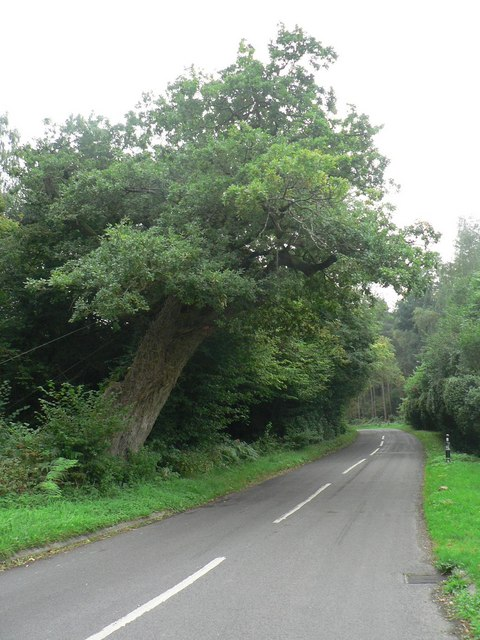
The Remedy Oak near Verwood.

The Bull Oak is an oak tree in a field near Lytchett Minster, inscribed with a coffin and the legend 'SC 1849'. The field belonged to a Samuel Crumpler, the SC in the inscription, who kept his bull there. In 1849, to prove the bull wasn't dangerous, Crumpler took a walk across the field and was promptly gored to death. The Remedy Oak just outside Verwood, is where King Edward VI stopped to rest while out hunting one day. At that time it was believed that an anointed king was so sacred he had the ability to cure the sick and so when the locals heard of his presence they gathered around him asking to be touched. This the king dutifully did. A third famous tree in the county is the Monmouth Ash which stood a few miles north of Bournemouth. It was beneath this tree, in a ditch, covered with ferns and bracken, that James Scott, 1st Duke of Monmouth was found, having been on the run since the Battle of Sedgemoor.

The Duke of Monmouth is supposed to haunt the road between Uplyme and Yawl, appearing on a white horse and sometimes accompanied by his followers. A figure dressed in Arab robes, thought to be the ghost of T. E. Lawrence has been seen entering his old Dorset home, Clouds Hill. It is said that on nights when there is a full moon, a phantom coach and horses travels between Woolbridge Manor in Wool, and the since disappeared, Turberville Mansion, Bere Regis. Hardy makes reference to this apparition in his book Tess of the D'urbervilles. The ghost of Sir Walter Raleigh, it is said, wanders the woods near his seat, the old Sherborne Castle, at midnight on Michaelmas Eve.

St Juthwara, a Celtic noblewoman, lived in Halstock in or around the 7th century. She was decapitated by her stepbrother who had been tricked into believing Juthwara was pregnant. It is said that a spring of water appeared where her head fell and that Juthwara promptly picked up her own head and walked to the local church, where she placed it on the altar. Her relics were taken to Sherborne Abbey sometime between 1045 and 1058 where she was greatly venerated until the abbey was destroyed during the dissolution. It is said that her headless ghost wanders the field where it is alleged she met her fate.

St Wite, one legend says, was a Breton princess murdered by Vikings in the 5th century. It is claimed she had the power to heal the sick and her shrine at Whitchurch Canonicorum has three large holes to enable those with ailments to get closer to her bones.

The Bath bomb and the Lava lamp may have originated in Dorset.

== Art and literature ==
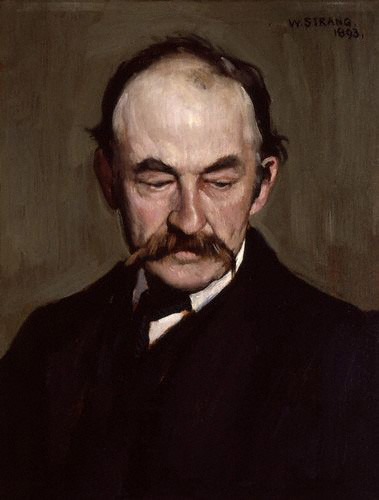
Thomas Hardy by the artist William Strang

Dorset is famed in English literature for being the native county of novelist and poet Thomas Hardy (1840–1928), and many of the places he describes in his novels in the fictional Wessex are in Dorset, which he renamed South Wessex. The National Trust owns Thomas Hardy's Cottage, in woodland east of Dorchester, and Max Gate, his former house in Dorchester, Dorset.

Several other writers have been influenced by the Dorset landscape, including P. D. James whose novel The Black Tower was inspired by Clavell Tower in Kimmeridge; and Enid Blyton who spent many holidays in Dorset, eventually moving to the Isle of Purbeck with her second husband. Many locations in her books were drawn from this area including Kirrin Castle (Corfe Castle) and Whispering Island (Brownsea). Studland was the inspiration for Noddy's Toyland and P.C. Plod is thought to have been based on the then local policeman, Christopher Rone.

William Barnes was born in the Blackmore Vale in 1801 and three volumes of his poetry in the Dorset dialect were published, the first, Poems of Rural Life in the Dorset Dialect was published in 1844. Barnes hated what he deemed 'foreign' words and avoided the use of them in his poetry, preferring instead to use the Saxon language. Where there was no Saxon equivalent, Barnes would often invent words and phrases, such as 'push wainling' instead of perambulator. Barnes had studied Celtic literature and often used a repetition of consonantal sounds known as cynghanedd. This is particularly noticeable in the poem, "My Orcha'd in Linden Lea".

Another poet who wrote in the local dialect was Robert Young whose work includes, "Rabin Hill's Visit to the Railway: What he Zeed and Done, and What he Zed About It".

While the novelist John Cowper Powys (1872–1963) was born in Shirley, Derbyshire, his father was from Dorset and the family moved to Dorchester, Dorset in 1880. The family then moved just across the Somerset border to Montacute in 1885, but Powys maintained a connection with Dorset because he attended Sherborne School, Sherborne, Dorset. Several of his novels, including Ducdame (1925), Wolf Solent (1929), Weymouth Sands (1934) and Maiden Castle (1936) are set in Dorset, while Powys's first novel Wood and Stone is dedicated to Thomas Hardy. Maiden Castle, which is set in Dorchester, was begun in 1934 after Powys's return from America. He initially lived in Dorset, first in Chaldon Herring and then Dorchester, before moving to Wales in 1935. After his death Powys's ashes were scattered on Chesil Beach, Weymouth, Dorset. His younger brother, novelist T. F. Powys, lived in Chaldon Herring from 1904 until 1940, when he moved to Mappowder, Dorset, because of the war. Chaldon Herring was the inspiration for the fictitious village of Folly Down in his novel Mr. Weston's Good Wine and other works. Theodore Powys's brother Llewelyn, a novelist and essayist, was born in Dorchester in 1884 and also lived for a while in Chaldon with his American wife Alyse Gregory (1884–1967) who he had married in 1924. She had been the editor of the influential journal The Dial. His works include Dorset Essays (1935). Both Theodore and Llewelyn also attended Sherborne School. Various other writers and artists lived in Chaldon at different times, including novelists Sylvia Townsend Warner and David Garnett and two more of the Powys family, the poet and novelist, Philippa Powys and the painter Gertrude Powys. Other residents were the poets Valentine Ackland (Townsend's lover) and Gamel Woolsey, an American, who had an affair with Llewelyn Powys.

== Sport and leisure ==
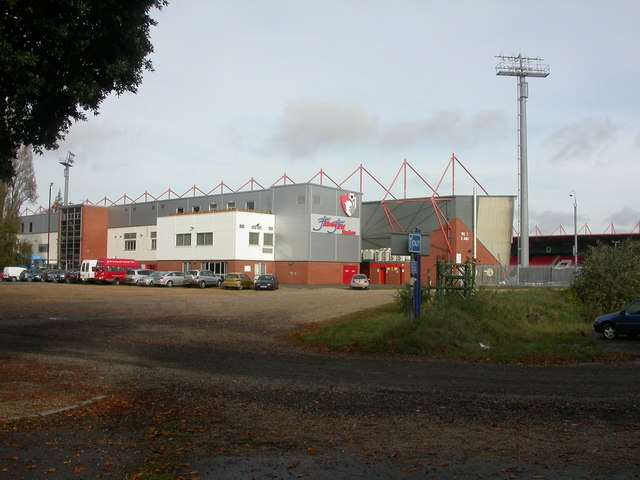
Dean Court, home of AFC Bournemouth

Dorset's only Football League club is A.F.C. Bournemouth who play in the Premier League—the highest division in the English football league system. Non-League semi-professional teams in the county include National League South team Poole Town F.C., and Southern Premier Division teams Wimborne Town FC and Dorchester Town F.C. and Weymouth F.C. Dorset County Cricket Club compete in the Minor Counties Cricket Championship and are based at Dean Park Cricket Ground in Bournemouth. Rugby Union is played throughout the county and the Dorset & Wiltshire Rugby Football Union is the constituent body responsible for organising rugby union competitions in the county on behalf of the Rugby Football Union (RFU). Bournemouth RFC compete in the fifth tier of national competition, Swanage & Wareham RFC compete in the sixth tier of national competition, with Dorchester, Wimborne and North Dorset Rugby Football Club in the seventh tier.

The county is noted for its watersports which take advantage of the sheltered waters of Weymouth Bay and Portland Harbour, and Poole Bay and Poole Harbour. Dorset hosted the sailing event at the 2012 Summer Olympics at the Weymouth and Portland National Sailing Academy in Portland Harbour. Along with Weymouth Bay, these waters have been credited by many, including the Royal Yachting Association, as being amongst the best in Northern Europe for sailing. The venue was completed in May 2009 and was used by international sailing teams in preparation for the event in 2012. Bournemouth has the third largest community of surfers in the UK and in 2009 an artificial surf reef, one of only four in the world, was constructed there. Designed to generate a grade 5 wave, the reef has failed to live up to expectations.

== Notable residents ==
The palaeontologist Mary Anning was born and lived in Lyme Regis. She discovered the first Ichthyosaur fossil when she was just 12 years old in 1811. She also found the first two plesiosaur skeletons in 1821. Mary went on to become one of the world's leading experts in the science of palaeontology. Lyme Regis was also the birthplace of the metallurgist, Percy Gilchrist and the ornithologist, artist and publisher, John Gould. Gould became the first curator of the Museum of Zoological Society, at the age of 22. The Gould League in Australia is named after him. The scientist and philosopher Robert Boyle, who is perhaps best known for Boyle's law, lived in Stalbridge Manor for a time; while the naturalist Alfred Russel Wallace whose theory of evolution prompted Charles Darwin to publish his own theory; was also a resident of Dorset, and is buried at Broadstone. Another naturalist, Thomas Bell, was born in Poole. Bell was professor of zoology at King's College, a lecturer in anatomy at Guy's Hospital and president of the Linnean Society. Tim Berners-Lee, inventor of the World Wide Web, lived in Corfe Mullen and began his career at telecommunications company Plessey in Poole. Men from Dorset were instrumental in the colonisation of the New World including George Somers from Lyme Regis who discovered Bermuda and Christopher Farwell from Poole who was present when Sir Humphrey Gilbert landed in Newfoundland. Explorer Sir Walter Raleigh lived in Sherborne for some of his life. Verney Lovett Cameron, the first European to cross Africa, was born in Weymouth.

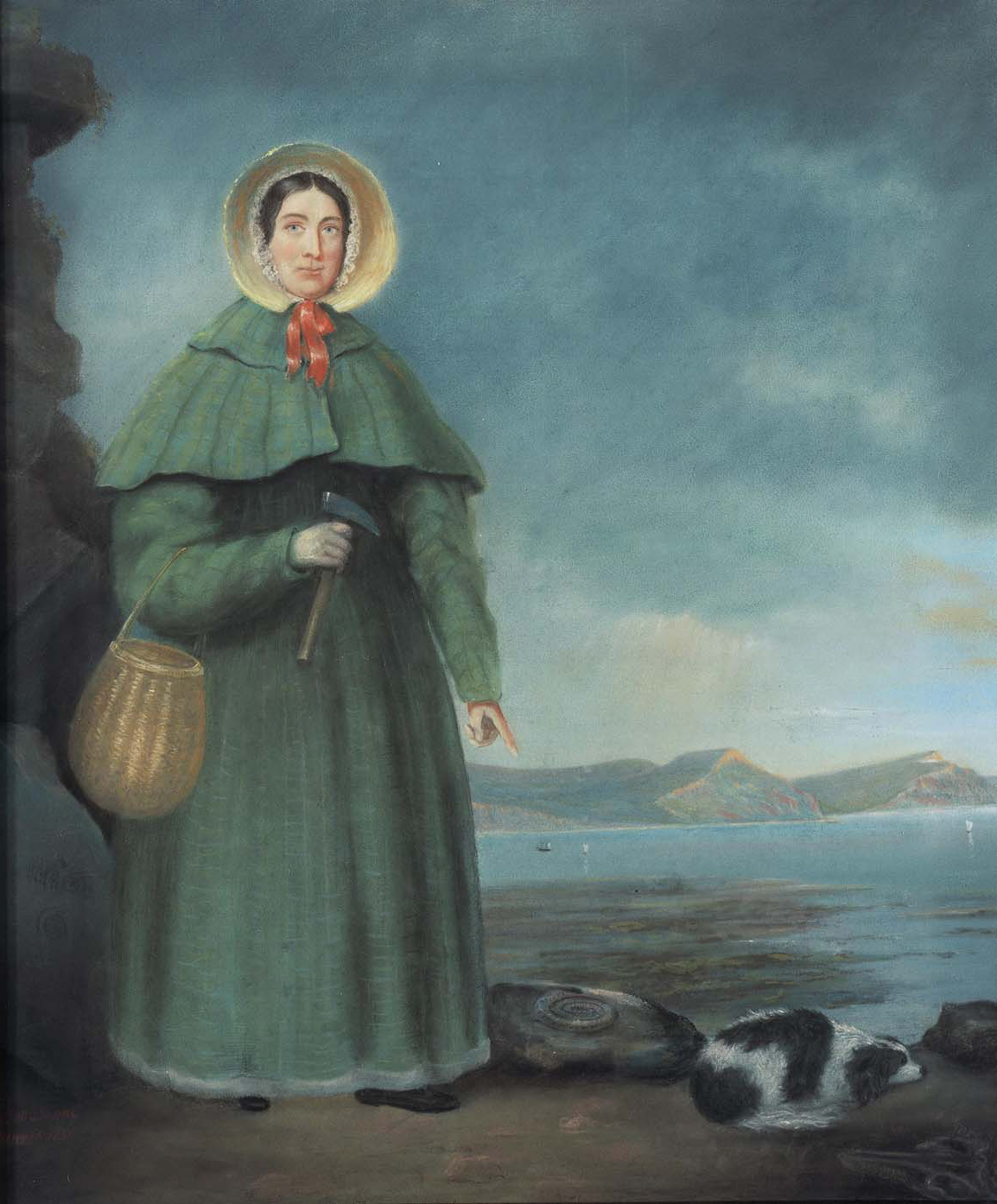
Mary Anning (1799–1847)

The notable, 19th century, Royal Navy admirals, and brothers; Samuel and Alexander Hood, were born in Thorncombe. Other notable mariners from Dorset include: Henry Digby, Charles Bullen and Thomas Masterman Hardy all of whom commanded ships at Trafalgar and played a major part in the victory. The county became the birthplace of the trade union movement when, in 1843, the Tolpuddle Martyrs formed the Friendly Society of Agricultural Labourers, and swore an oath of loyalty to one another. In 1686, Thomas Erle hosted a secret meeting in the ice house at Charborough Park. The discussion led directly to the Glorious Revolution of 1688. The Soviet spy Anthony Blunt was born in Bournemouth in 1907. He was stripped of his knighthood in 1979 for treason. Dorset has produced two archbishops: John Morton and William Wake.

Dorset is a popular home for performing artists. Those who have moved to or own second homes in Dorset include the director Guy Ritchie, actors Martin Clunes and Edward Fox; singer-songwriters Billy Bragg and Noel Gallagher; and television personalities Jonathan Ross and Hugh Fearnley-Whittingstall, whose programmes are filmed at his home, just outside Bridport. The classical composer Muzio Clementi lived and worked near Blandford in Dorset. Several writers have called Dorset home, including Douglas Adams (author of The Hitchhiker's Guide to the Galaxy), who lived in Stalbridge for a time; Ian Fleming (James Bond), who boarded at Durnford School, poet William Barnes; John le Carré, author of espionage novels; Tom Sharpe of Wilt fame lived there as does P.D. James (The Children of Men); satirical novelist Thomas Love Peacock; John Fowles (The French Lieutenant's Woman), lived in Lyme Regis before he died in late 2005; Robert Louis Stevenson wrote The Strange Case of Dr Jekyll and Mr Hyde while living in Bournemouth. Dorset is also the birthplace of artist Sir James Thornhill, and photographer Jane Bown,

== Popular music ==
Al Stewart, one of the most internationally successful singer-songwriters of the 1970s, grew up in Wimborne Minster. Robert Fripp, leader of King Crimson and an influential figure in rock music worldwide, also grew up in Wimborne. Greg Lake, who initially sang in King Crimson alongside Fripp and then sold millions of albums in many countries as vocalist and producer of Emerson, Lake and Palmer, grew up in Poole. P.J. Harvey grew up near Bridport at Corscombe and still lives in West Bay. The region has also produced musicians in a style often described as "urban", with the grime artist Isaiah Dreads having grown up in Dorchester.

== Bibliography ==
- Arkell, W. J., 1978. The Geology of the Country around Weymouth, Swanage, Corfe & Lulworth. London: Geological Survey of Great Britain, HMSO
- Blamires, H., 1983. A Guide to Twentieth century Literature in English. Taylor & Francis. ISBN 978-0-416-36450-7
- Cullingford, Cecil N., 1980. A History Of Dorset. Chichester: Phillimore & Co Ltd.
- Chaffey, John (2004). The Dorset Landscape, Its Scenery and Geology. Halsgrove House, Tiverton: Dorset Books. ISBN 1-871164-43-5.
- Davies, G. M., 1956. A Geological Guide to the Dorset Coast; 2nd ed. London: A & C Black
- Draper, Jo (2003). Dorset; The Complete Guide. Wimborne, Dorset: Dovecote Press Ltd. ISBN 0-946159-40-8.
- Dwyer, Jack, 2009. Dorset Pioneers. Stroud: The History Press ISBN 978-0-7524-5346-0
- "Dorsetshire" . Encyclopædia Britannica. Vol. 8 (11th ed.). 1911. pp. 434–436.
- Hilliam, David (2010). The Little Book of Dorset. Stroud, Glos.: The History Press. ISBN 978-0-7524-5704-8.
- Newman, John & Pevsner, Nikolaus The Buildings of England; Dorset. Harmondsworth: Penguin Books 1972; Reprint 1975. ISBN 0-14-071044-2 (For Abbey Farm House); p. 134
- Perkins, John W., 1977. Geology Explained in Dorset. Newton Abbot: David & Charles
- Pitt-Rivers, Michael, 1968. Dorset. London: Faber & Faber
- Taylor, Christopher, 1970. The Making of the Dorset landscape. London: Hodder & Stoughton
- West, Ian, 2004. Geology of the Wessex Coast and Southern England, Southampton University, (Accessed between September 2003 and October 2004)
- Wright, John (2003). Discover Dorset, Rivers and Streams. Wimborne, Dorset: Dovecote Press. ISBN 1-904349-10-2.
