= Winfrith Newburgh =

Village in Dorset, England

Coordinates: 50.6623°N 2.2744°W

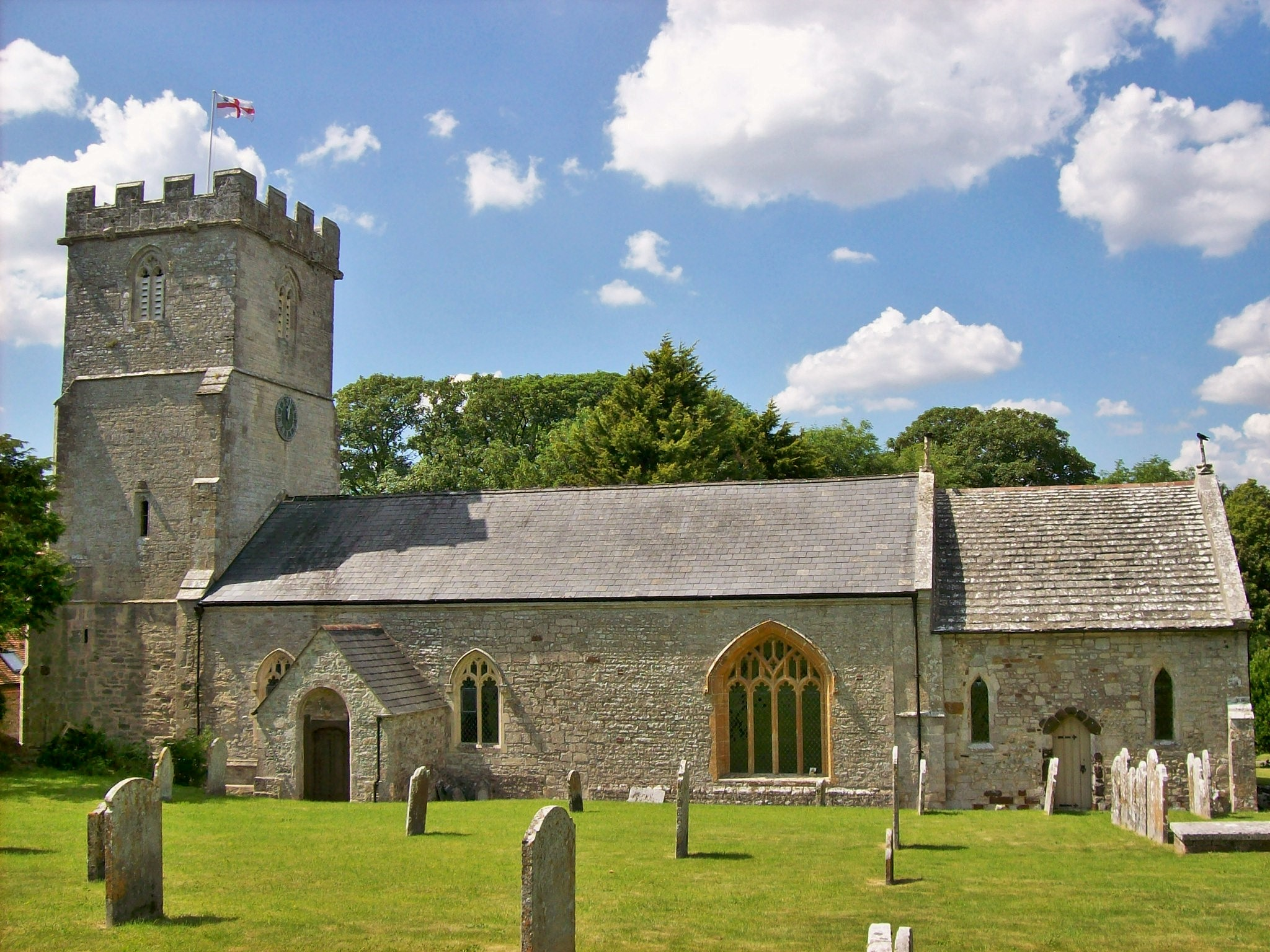
- St Christopher's parish church

- Location within Dorset
- Population: 669 (2011)
- OS grid reference: SY800850
- Civil parish: Winfrith Newburgh
- Unitary authority: Dorset
- Ceremonial county: Dorset
- Region: South West
- Country: England
- Sovereign state: United Kingdom
- Post town: Dorchester
- Postcode district: DT2
- Dialling code: 01305
- Police: Dorset
- Fire: Dorset and Wiltshire
- Ambulance: South Western
- UK Parliament: South Dorset
- Website: Winfrith Newburgh & East Knighton

Winfrith Newburgh (/ˌwɪnfrɪθ ˈnjuːbərə/), commonly called just Winfrith, is a village and civil parish in Dorset, England. It is about 8 miles (13 km) west of Wareham and 10 miles (16 km) east of the county town Dorchester. It was historically part of the Winfrith hundred. In the 2011 Census the civil parish – which includes the hamlet of East Knighton to the northeast – had 300 households and a population of 669. An electoral ward simply named "Winfrith" exists but extends northwards to Briantspuddle. The total population of this ward was 1,618.

== Description ==
The name Winfrith derives from the river Win, which runs through the village. In 1086 in the Domesday Book it was recorded as Winfrode, and Bolla the priest held the manor. It was later granted to Robert de Neubourg, whose descendants were Lords of the Manor until the death of Sir Roger Newburgh in 1514. The family name is incorporated into the village's name. The lordship then passed, along with the Newburghs' foundation of Bindon Abbey, to the Marney family, and then to the Poynings and the Howards, before being purchased by the Weld family in 1641.

The ancient road from Dorchester to Wareham ran through the centre of the village. However this was replaced by a turnpike (now the A352 road) in the 18th century, and the village is now south of the main road. The Red Lion Inn marks the turn to the village. North of the road is the hamlet of East Knighton. The hamlet of East Burton, further east, was formerly in the parish of Winfrith Newburgh, but is now part of Wool.

Also to the north of the village is the Dorset Green Technology Park, on the site of the former UKAEA Winfrith Atomic Energy Establishment. The latter was in service from the 1950s to early 1990s, and the Steam Generating Heavy Water Reactor was developed there. The surrounding heathland is a Dorset Wildlife Trust nature reserve, Tadnoll and Winfrith Heath.

The Church of England parish church of Saint Christopher was extensively restored and enlarged in 1854. At this time the north aisle was added, however some Norman architectural features still remain, the most notable being the north doorway. The parish registers date from 1585. The parish was merged with those of Chaldon Herring, East Lulworth and West Lulworth in 1979.

The village has a Church of England Primary School (now merged with that at West Lulworth), a post office, a football team, a cricket club, a drama club, a swimming pool, and a basketball court. Knighton Heath, the Five Marys and Maggot Wood (Coombe Wood) are used for horse riding.

== The Winfrith Riot ==
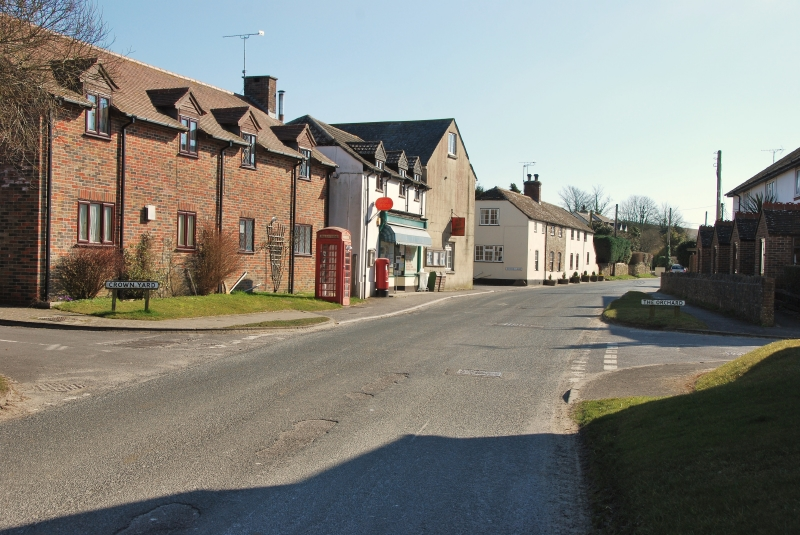
The centre of Winfrith Newburgh

Winfrith was the scene of an initially peaceful protest by agricultural workers on Monday 29 November 1830 during the Swing riots. The Riot Act was read by the local magistrate, James Frampton of Moreton, however the protesters failed to disperse and three men were arrested. The events were described by Frampton's sister, Mary Frampton, in her journal:

November 28th [1830] – Notice was received of an intended rising of the people at the adjacent villages of Winfrith, Wool, and Lulworth – the latter six miles [10 km] off – which took place on the 30th [actually the 29th, the date given in the Dorchester prison registers]. My brother, Mr Frampton, was joined very early on that morning by a large body of farmers etc. from his immediate neighbourhood, as well as some from a distance, all special constables, amounting to upwards of 150, armed only with a short staff, the pattern for which had been sent by order of Government to equip what was called the Constabulary force. The numbers increased as they rode on towards Winfrith, where the clergyman [George Ingram Fisher] was unpopular, and his premises supposed to be in danger. The mob, urged on from behind hedges etc. by a number of women and children, advanced rather respectfully, and with their hats in their hands, to demand increase of wages, but would not listen to the request that they would disperse. The Riot Act was read. They still urged forwards, and came close up to Mr Frampton's horse; he then collared one man, but in giving him in charge he slipped from his captors by leaving his smock-frock in their hands. Another mob from Lulworth were said to be advancing, and as the first mob seemed to have dispersed, Mr F[rampton] was going, almost alone, to speak to them, when he was cautioned to beware, as the others had retreated only to advance again with more effect in the rear. The whole body of the constabulary then advanced with Mr Frampton, and, after an ineffectual parley, charged them, when three men were taken, and were conveyed by my brother and his son Henry, and a part of the constabulary force, to Dorchester, and committed to gaol. I was at Moreton that day with Lady Harriot F[rampton]. Our gentlemen returned about six o'clock; they described the mob they had encountered as being in general very fine-looking young men, and particularly well-dressed, as if they had put on their best clothes for the occasion.

The treatment of the three men arrested was fairly lenient by the standards of the day: one was imprisoned for three months and all three were bound over to keep the peace for two years. The underlying causes of the Swing Riots – low pay and increased mechanisation – remained however, and in 1832 a group of agricultural workers from Tolpuddle – eight miles (13 kilometres) north of Winfrith – formed a Friendly Society to protest against these same issues. In 1834 the same James Frampton who had read the Riot Act at Winfrith invoked an obscure law against oath-swearing to prosecute what became known as the Tolpuddle Martyrs.
