= Alyse Gregory =

American-British suffragist and writer

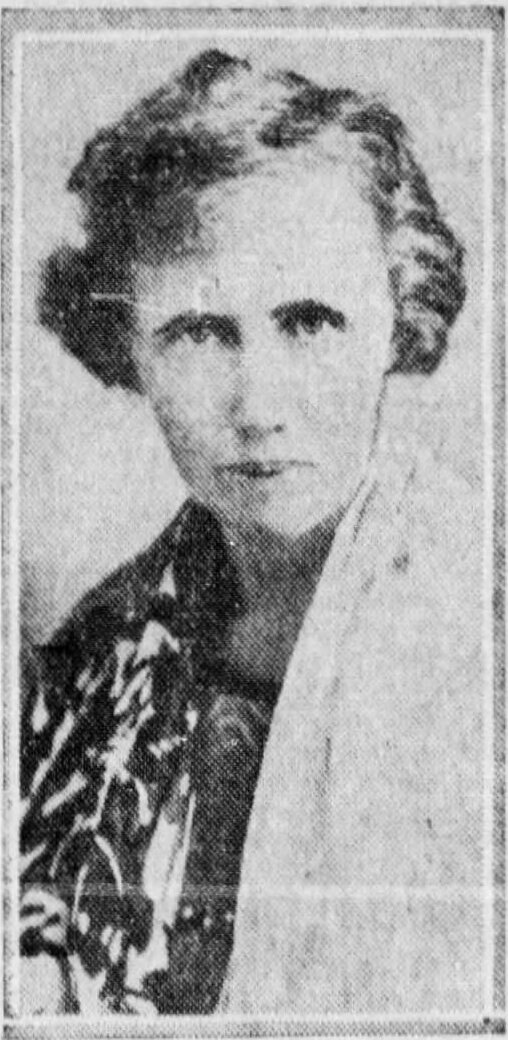
- Born: July 19, 1884; Norwalk, Connecticut, US
- Died: August 27, 1967 (aged 83); Morebath, Devon, UK
- Occupations: Suffragist, writer
- Spouse: Llewelyn Powys (m. 1924; died 1939)
- Father: James G. Gregory

Alyse Earle Gregory (July 19, 1882 – August 27, 1967) was an American-British suffragist and writer. Gregory worked as a woman's suffrage advocate in Connecticut, New Jersey and New York. She became an editor of the literary magazine, The Dial, and was a published author of novels and essays.

== Biography ==
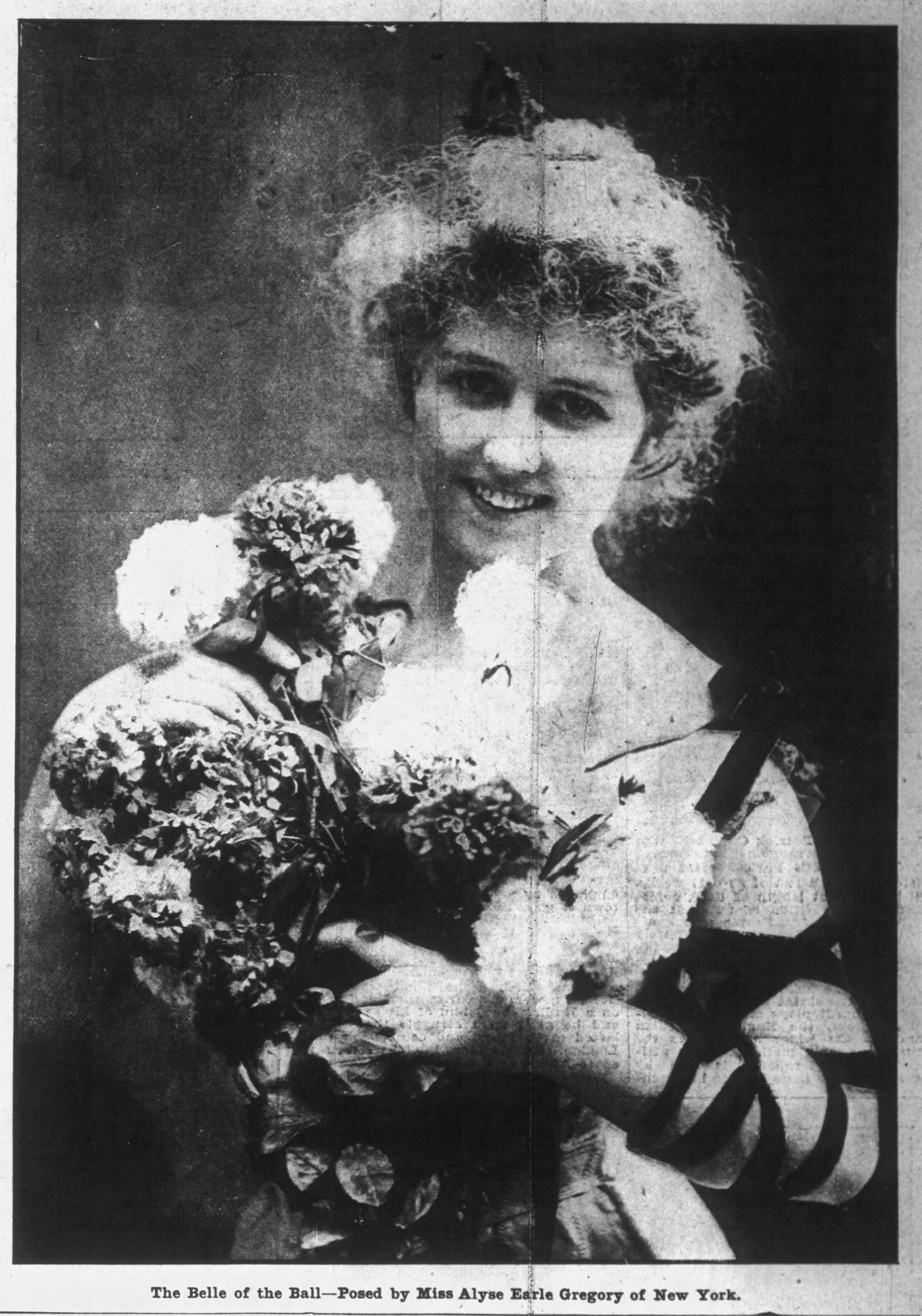
Alyse Earle Gregory 1904

Gregory was born as Alice Earle Gregory in Norwalk, Connecticut on July 19, 1882. Later, she and the family would spell her name as "Alyse." Gregory's father, James G. Gregory, was a doctor and the two had a close relationship. Dr. Gregory was supportive of his daughter even in her most non-conformist ways, which she started displaying at an early age. Gregory ran away from school twice as a young girl, hating the tedium of lessons. Gregory also showed early musical talent and was sent to Paris in 1899 to receive a musical education with famous concert singer Katherine Tanner Fisk. For four years she took singing lessons in Paris and in New York City. Gregory disliked singing in public and didn't have the stature for opera singing, so she returned to the United States.

In 1912, Gregory became the leader of the Norwalk Civic League and became involved with worker's rights. Through her experiences in the league came to feel that women's suffrage would help promote labor reforms. Gregory went on to become a key leader in the Connecticut Woman Suffrage Association (CWSA) through which she directed activities such as meetings, plays, and parades alongside Cromwell native Emily Miller Pierson. In 1913, Gregory teamed up with Pierson for a Connecticut state automobile speaking tour to support women's suffrage. She later worked as assistant state organizer for the New Jersey Woman Suffrage Association during a referendum on woman suffrage in 1915 and was also active for the cause in the State of New York. Gregory was involved with the National Woman's Party protests (NWP) in New York City. In July 1916, she published a national article about women laborers in The Woman Voter, entitled, "Women and the Garment Workers." In working on the article, she used her abilities to speak Italian and French fluently in order to connect with immigrant labor workers. Gregory also used her fluency with languages during Connecticut woman's suffrage campaigns. She would translate speeches given by Pierson into Italian, French or German. From April to October 1915, Gregory worked with Pierson on suffrage campaigns in New Jersey. In 1919, Gregory protested in Washington, D.C. in favor of woman's suffrage with the National Woman's Party (NWP) and Elsie Hill.

Gregory lived in New York City starting in 1916. Around this time, she began contributing articles to such publications as The Freeman, The New Republic and The Dial. She wrote articles in favor of social justice. Early in 1918, Gregory opened her own tea shop in Greenwich Village and the shop became a gathering place where writers and artists would gather. When her friend, Randolph Bourne died in 1918, Gregory lost a close friend and an "intellectual sparring partner." Also in 1918, Gregory visited Denmark and Scotland, staying in Glasgow with Florida Scott-Maxwell. Gregory moved to Patchin Place in 1921.

While Gregory was living in Greenwich Village, Scofield Thayer was recruiting her to become an editor for The Dial, starting in 1922. The offer at The Dial would mean that she would be paid $25 more per week than Gilbert Seldes, the current editor. She eventually accepted. From 1923 to 1925, Gregory worked as the first woman managing editor of The Dial. Her name was first included on the masthead of the magazine in February 1924. While Powys worked for the magazine, she helped keep things on "an even keel."

In 1921, she met writer Llewelyn Powys. Gregory helped expand Powys' literary network and he also relied on her advice as an editor. Initially, Gregory had been against marriage. However, on September 30, 1924, Gregory married Powys. Gregory didn't tell her parents until after the wedding. Two reasons she gave her father for marrying Powys were that he wanted to get married and that his health was poor. In April 1925, Gregory retired from The Dial to move to England with her husband. Powys was involved in persuading her to leave the position. Despite leaving formally, Gregory continued to write literary reviews for The Dial through 1929.

Powys and Gregory both visited Sigmund Freud in Vienna in 1926. In 1927, Powys had an affair with Gamel Woolsey. Gregory and her husband visited Palestine in 1928 so Powys could do research for an upcoming book. During this trip, Powys found out that Woolsey had a miscarriage. After returning from Palestine, Woolsey arrived to move near Powys and during this time, Gregory was involved with the affair which she both "encouraged" and "suffered exquisitely." The love triangle between Gregory, Powys and Woolsey was complicated, especially because Gregory believed in free love. Gregory and Powys spent the winter of 1930 in a house in the Berkshire Mountains lent to them by Edna St. Vincent Millay and Eugen Boissevain. After Llewelyn Powys' death from tuberculosis in 1939, Gregory continued to live on the Dorset coast in England.

In 1956, Alyse presented the author Rosemary Manning with a copy of Wheels on Gravel inscribed with a quotation from George Santayana: 'To understand oneself is the classic form of consolation, to elude oneself is the romantic'. In 1957, Alyse Gregory moved into Velthams Cottage, Morebath, Devon. After the sudden death of her landlady on May 12, 1958, Velthams was bought at auction in 1960 by the writer Oliver Stonor, who had known Alyse previously; they were both present at local celebrations in East Chaldon on 7 or 8 May 1945, for the end of the Second World War in Europe, which took the form of a large bonfire near the Five Marys, a local group of prehistoric barrows.

In her last years, many friends visited her, in spite of the rural isolation of Morebath, which had a railway station until 1966. Alyse had long been an advocate of voluntary euthanasia, and planned her own, careful death. She died from a barbiturate overdose on 27 August 1967. Her last visitor on the day of her death was the author Rosemary Manning who described the visit in her autobiography A Corridor of Mirrors.

== Writing ==
Gregory helped turn The Dial into "a first rate magazine of the fine arts," according to E. E. Cummings. As an editor at The Dial, Gregory was considered a "powerful arbiter of literary style." Gregory created a set of general instructions for the editorial department at The Dial which continued to be used after she retired. While she was married to Llewellyn Powys, she edited his works.

Her first published novel was She Shall Have Music (1926) which explored themes of sexual awakening and individual freedom. The story follows the life and intellectual longings of a wealthy young woman, Sylvia Brown, who experiences life in Long Island and Greenwich Village. The New Yorker described She Shall Have Music as a story that that captures the modern speech and mores of her characters. The New Republic wrote that the story had all the elements it needed to be complete, but that it ended up flat and somewhat boring.

King Log and Lady Lea (1929) is a tragic novel that deals with marriage and infidelity and the relationship between a wife and her husband's lover. The Bystander called the novel "interesting and peculiar."

Gregory's novel, Hester Craddock (1931), uses many of her own personal experiences to develop the two main characters. The story is set in the English Downs and focuses on two sisters and the men in their lives. The eponymous character is neurotic and in love with an artist, who in turn, loves her sister. One of the story's characters was based on her friend, Randolph Bourne where she explores how disability can affect a person's sexuality. The New York Times remarked that in this story, her prose was "sober and economical."

Wheels on Gravel (1938) was a series of eleven published essays on various topics, including marriage. Much of the subject matter in the essays was "sensitive, original, if rather bleakly pessimistic."

During World War II Gregory had trouble publishing her work while she lived in England. The Day is Gone (1948) is Gregory's autobiography, published in 1948. The autobiography covers her time working towards woman's suffrage in the United States and her relationship with other literary figures. She also reminisced about individuals who worked with her at The Dial. The autobiography ends just before her marriage to Powys, who she never mentions by name in the book.

In 1973, selections from her journals were published under the title The Cry of a Gull 1923-1948.

=== Selected bibliography ===
- She Shall Have Music (1926) OCLC 6924533
- King Log and Lady Lea (1929) OCLC 27732505
- Hester Craddock (1931) OCLC 770050
- Wheels on Gravel (1938) OCLC 3473640
- The Day Is Gone (1948) OCLC 676790
- The Cry of a Gull: Journals, 1923-1948 (1973) ISBN 9780950051079
