= Winfrith =

UK Atomic Energy Authority site in Dorset

Winfrith nuclear power station
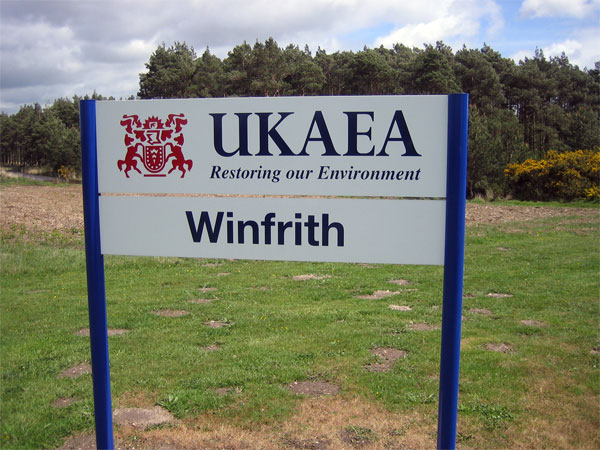
- UKAEA sign
- Country: United Kingdom
- Location: Winfrith Newburgh, Dorset
- Coordinates: 50.682°N 2.261°W
- Status: Decommissioned
- Construction began: 1957
- Commission date: 1959
- Decommission date: 2021
- Operator: UKAEA

Nuclear power station
- Reactor type: SGHWR

Thermal power station
- Primary fuel: Nuclear

Power generation
- Nameplate capacity: 100 MW

External links
- Website: www.ukaea.org.uk/sites/winfrith_site.htm
- Commons: Related media on Commons

Winfrith Atomic Energy Establishment, or AEE Winfrith, was a United Kingdom Atomic Energy Authority site near Winfrith Newburgh in Dorset. It covered an area on Winfrith Heath to the west of the village of Wool between the A352 road and the South West Main Line.

Winfrith was set up in order to test a variety of new nuclear reactor designs with the intention of selecting a new design for power generation and other tasks. The main design built at the site was the demonstration steam-generating heavy water reactor (SGHWR) providing power to the National Grid. A number of smaller designs were also constructed at the site.

The site officially opened with the ZENITH reactor in 1960. SGHWR opened in 1967 and was shut down in 1990. All of the reactors have been shut down and are in various stages of removal. The site is now being re-used for other purposes while decommissioning continues.

== Nuclear research ==
The initial steps that led to the formation of Winfrith began with the creation of the United Kingdom Atomic Energy Authority (AEA) from the former Atomic Energy Research Establishment (AERE) in 1954. John Cockcroft, in charge of the Research Group, immediately began pressing for a new site to be set aside for the construction of multiple experimental reactors, with the aim being to try many designs in order to develop the best possible commercial systems. This was opposed by Christopher Hinton, of the Industrial Group, who wanted to pick a single design and focus their energies on that. Cockcroft eventually won the acrimonious argument.

The site in Dorset was selected and led to the formation of the opposition group, the Dorset Land Resources Committee, led by Colonel Joseph Weld. The AEA were granted planning permission for the development by Dorset County Council, which was confirmed by a public inquiry, but during the process it was discovered that various rights of common may have existed over the land. In order to enable the development to go ahead as quickly as possible, the government introduced, and Parliament passed, the Winfrith Heath Act 1957, extinguishing any rights of common over the land, and allowing for a compensation process for any commoners whose rights had been extinguished. The AEA acquired 650 acres (260 hectares) by compulsory purchase order and another similar size through normal purchases to bring the site to 1,350 acres (550 hectares) acres. To house the staff, they also purchased 153 homes in Bournemouth and Poole for staff to rent, as well as 127 in Weymouth, 100 in Dorchester, 24 in Wareham and 12 in Wool. The Durley Hall Hotel at Branksome Chine was bought in 1958 for single staff and temporary accommodation.

Construction began in 1957, and the first low-energy reactor, ZENITH, was completed and in operation by the end of 1959. 1959 also marked the commencement of the five mile pipeline to the sea at Arish Mell The site did not officially open until 16 September 1960. This was quickly followed by two new reactors, NESTOR in 1961 and DIMPLE in 1962. Many others followed. Cockcroft also suggested that larger fusion reactors be built at Winfrith, but this was met by serious pushback from the scientists involved in the programme. This work instead moved to today's Culham Centre for Fusion Energy.

Staffing peaked at 2,350 in 1966, but the site slowly wound down and the staff was 1,800 by 1978. The largest reactor at the site (SGHWR), closed in 1990, and the site turned primarily to disposal of nuclear waste. In 1995, the eastern part of the site became the Winfrith Technology Centre, and 218 acres (88 hectares) on the western side were decommissioned. The last reactor was shut down in 1995, with decommissioning of the site scheduled to finish 2021. However the process of decommissioning is ongoing as of 2025 with a public consultation being held about how to proceed with the decommissioning and disposal of waste from the two remaining reactors. The consultation is scheduled to finish in autumn 2026. The consultation is around the burial of low level radioactive waste on the site in the underground basements of the two remaining reactors.

Winfrith housed several experimental reactors during its lifetime. There were also impact test facilities, and a used nuclear fuel examination facility with the associated hot cells.

Experimental reactors included:

- ZENITH (Zero Energy High Temperature Reactor) built in 1959. It was a zero-energy reactor which was used to study the physics of high temperature reactors.
- NESTOR (Neutron Source Thermal Reactor) built in 1961. Based on the JASON reactor operated by the Hawker Siddeley Nuclear Power Corporation at Langley, Berkshire. NESTOR was a small research reactor which produced a large amount of neutrons making it a useful tool for investigating the design of power-producing reactors and carrying out sub-critical experiments on core assemblies.
- DIMPLE (Deuterium Moderated Pile of Low Energy) built in 1962. Originally built at Harwell in 1954, Dimple was Britain's first heavy water reactor. It was moved to Winfrith in 1962 and extensively modified and rebuilt for studies of the physics of reactor systems moderated by light or heavy water and by an organic moderator.
- ZEBRA (Zero Energy Breeder Reactor Assembly) built in 1962. Designed for studying the neutron physics of a wide variety of fuel assemblies containing uranium and plutonium.
- HECTOR (Hot Enriched Carbon-moderated Thermal Oscillator Reactor) built in 1963. Designed to examine the suitability of various materials for use in power reactors.
- JUNO, built in 1964. Built from the components of a zero-energy graphite moderated reactor called NERO, and from a sub-critical assembly used for steam generating heavy water reactor investigations, it was used to provide the information needed for the design of small power reactor cores.
- The Dragon reactor was built in 1964. It was the first power reactor built at Winfrith. It was an experimental reactor built as a European inter-governmental research and development project. It was the first demonstration high-temperature gas-cooled reactor (HTGR) and had a thermal output of 20 MW. It operated until 1976.

== Winfrith Steam Generating Heavy Water Reactor ==
=== Design ===
The largest reactor at Winfrith was a steam-generating heavy water reactor (SGHWR) commonly known as the Winfrith Reactor. It was designed by the UKAEA, and was intended to combine the features of the CANDU reactor and pressurised water reactor (PWR). The core consisted of a bank of metal pressure tubes (zirconium alloy) which passed through vertical tubes in a tank of heavy water moderator – allowing the designers to do without the pressure vessel that normally contained the reactor's core. The pressure tubes contained the fuel which was cooled by a flow of light water up the tubes, generating steam. The fuel was slightly enriched uranium. The power level was varied by the level of the moderator. The reactor exported up to 100 MW of electric power to the National Grid. For many years it was the largest water cooled reactor in the United Kingdom.

=== History ===
Construction of the reactor began in 1963. It began operating in 1967, and was notable for being built within the allotted timescale (four years), and for being under-budget. It was built as a demonstration reactor, with the intention of building a series of commercial reactors based on the design. However, the SGHWR design was never advanced beyond the prototype at Winfrith, and the design was sidelined in favour of advanced gas-cooled reactors (AGR). The Winfrith reactor was shut down in 1990.

== The site today ==
The site is now split between the nuclear licensed site, the extensive Dorset Innovation Park (formerly Winfrith Technology Centre) and the headquarters of the Dorset Police.

Ownership of the Winfrith Nuclear site has now passed to the Nuclear Decommissioning Authority (NDA). The site is managed by NDA subsidiary Nuclear Restoration Services (formerly Magnox Ltd), who are contracted to deliver the site decommissioning programme. In 2022, over 1000 drums of radioactive waste from the Steam-Generating Heavy Water Reactor will be transported by 11 trains to the Low Level Waste Repository. The material was once intermediate-level waste but had decayed down to low-level waste while being stored at Winfrith.

== See also ==
- Nuclear power in the United Kingdom
- Energy policy of the United Kingdom
