= Albert Glinsky =

American composer and author (born 1952)

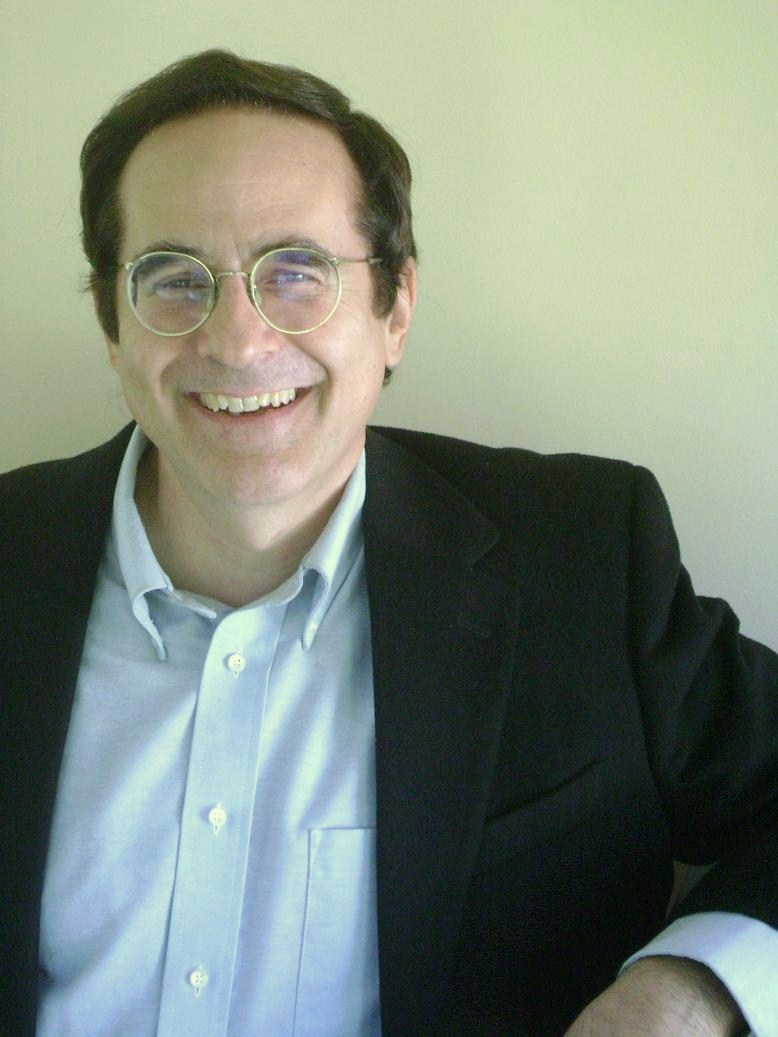
- Born: December 9, 1952 (age 73); New York City, United States
- Education: Juilliard School, New York University
- Known for: Music Composition; Author
- Website: albertglinsky.com

Albert Glinsky (born December 9, 1952) is an American composer and author. His music has been performed internationally by soloists, ensembles, and dance companies. His book, Theremin: Ether Music and Espionage won the 2001 ASCAP Deems Taylor Award, and is regarded as the standard work on the life of Leon Theremin. In 2009 Glinsky was invited by the family of synthesizer pioneer, Bob Moog (who wrote the foreword to Glinsky's Theremin), to create Moog's biography. Switched On: Bob Moog and the Synthesizer Revolution, with a Foreword by Francis Ford Coppola, was released by Oxford University Press on September 23, 2022.

== Life ==
Glinsky is the son of American sculptors, Cleo Hartwig and Vincent Glinsky. He grew up in Greenwich Village, attended the High School of Music and Art (now the Fiorello H. LaGuardia High School), and studied composition with Joan Tower and Otto Luening. He received his bachelor and master of music degrees in composition from the Juilliard School where his principal teacher was David Diamond. He earned his Ph.D. in composition from New York University, specializing in electroacoustic music. Glinsky has served on the faculty of Montclair State University, was BMI Composer-in-Residence at Vanderbilt University, and is currently Professor Emeritus and Director of the Composition program at Mercyhurst University in Pennsylvania. He is married to harpsichordist/pianist Linda Kobler. They have two children, son, Luka Glinsky, and daughter, Allegra Glinsky.

== Musical works ==
Glinsky's music has been recorded on the RCA Red Seal, Koch International Classics, Centaur, BMG Catalyst, and Leonore labels. His work is published by C.F. Peters, E.C. Schirmer, Hinshaw Press, and American Composers Edition.

Since his earliest student days at Juilliard, Glinsky forged a style based on the melding of contemporary popular musics with classical traditions—one of the first composers to cross-pollinate such radically different musical styles. The American writer and music critic, Tim Page observed that, "Glinsky's work is generated by American popular music, and is cast in a traditional framework of gesture and form." The first piece to fully incorporate this idea was the Rhapsody for Solo Violin, Flute, Strings, and Timpani (1971-1974), described variously by critics as evoking, "the hoedown sound of Kentucky bluegrass," and employing, "pentatonic, a dash of Blues, Country, pop and quartal harmonies...skillfully and organically mixed."The Philadelphia Inquirer wrote that the Rhapsody, "effectively translates…'folk-rock music and other popular musics' into an orchestral format."

In a similar vein, the composer's piano Elegy (1976) was noted by The Washington Post as "a rhapsodic, syncopated classical jazz ballad that is splendidly crafted." Allan Kozinn, writing in The New York Times, termed the Elegy, "…a beautifully wrought fantasy, in which diverse influences (from Debussy to Cecil Taylor, with a touch of Rachmaninoff) show through but never dominate. Its central section is full of fascinating and unpredictable harmonic turns." Another early work to make significant use of pop idioms was the Mass for Children's Voices (1978), a piece which the composer stated, "is set in a contemporary folk/rock style, yet at the same time has traditional overtones of chorale writing and unison chant."

American Record Guide remarked on Glinsky's success in combining disparate styles in Sunbow (1983), which "reflects the world of unmeasured preludes beloved by his wife, Linda Kobler (the harpsichordist for whom the work was written) and his own zest for rock music (he cites Stevie Wonder as the inspiration . . .) Believe it or not, the combination works and the results are a lot more sophisticated than you'd think." Glinsky's blending of pop and classical influences has also been noted in Toccata-Scherzo (1988), defined by American critic Alex Ross as "an encore-like showpiece driven by a pop pulse." Similarly, Glinsky's Piano Concerto (1993) was characterized as "a modern classical work heavily influenced by contemporary pop and rock music. The synthesis of styles—a Glinsky trademark—provides not only an overall, idiomatic effect but specific musical nuggets—points of inspiration drawn from contemporary performers such as folk rocker Suzanne Vega... or British concept rocker Kate Bush."

Glinsky's Canandaigua Quartet (1996), which opens the Oregon String Quartet's CD, All That Jazz; Jazz and Rock Influences in the Contemporary American String Quartet, prompted the Journal of the Society for American Music to comment: "If we may indeed interpret this recording as a melding of two worlds, this selection is a perfect one with which to raise the curtain." The review likened portions of the first movement to "a back-beat rhythm in a rock band," while the last movement, "Spin Out", was noted for "especially interesting ponticello, tremolo, and glissando effects that simulate an electric guitar or synthesizer." Fanfare magazine remarked on the "folk elements in the already heady jazz and rock mix."

Another compositional area Glinsky has explored is electronic music, prompted by the work he did at the New York University studios in the mid-1980s with a variety of digital and analog synthesizers including the alphaSyntauri, Voyetra-8, Serge, Buchla, Moog, McLeyvier, Aries, Yamaha DX7, and the Fairlight CMI. His interest in 'art rock' artists, some of whom were using these instruments on their albums, sparked a series of short compositions created entirely in the studio. The composer's 1995 piece on the subject of homelessness, Day Walker, Night Wanderer, is a 45-minute dramatic work for chamber ensemble, solo vocalist, and an electronic score. It was commissioned for the Philadelphia-based new music ensemble, Relâche, which created the premiere. In his program notes for the first performance, Glinsky wrote, "Stylistically, the work draws upon many resources: the integration of rock and jazz elements which characterize my work as a whole; an interest in electronic sound collage from my days at the electronic music studios of New York University; and a long standing fascination with the music of such 'concept rockers' as Kate Bush and Peter Gabriel. In short, I have attempted to join together 'art song' and 'art rock' in an amalgam which draws the deeper levels of psychological exploration from the one, and weds it to the spontaneity and directness of the other."

Among Glinsky's recent works are his Allegheny Quartet (2009), commissioned for the 250th Anniversary of the city of Pittsburgh—described by the Pittsburgh Tribune-Review as "an immediately appealing work," incorporating "the very effective setting of Native American, French and English folk tunes," and his Sun Chanter (2013), commissioned for the 100th Anniversary of the Erie Philharmonic—a piece which, according to the composer, integrates influences of musical theater into the harmonic language.

Albert Glinsky's works have been heard throughout the U.S., Europe, and the Far East in such venues as Lincoln Center, Kennedy Center, the Aspen Music Festival, Wolf Trap, Tokyo's Suntory Hall, and the Salle Cortot in Paris. His works have been commissioned, performed, and recorded by such organizations as the Zurich Chamber Orchestra, the Cavani String Quartet, the Pittsburgh New Music Ensemble, Relache, the Boys Choir of Harlem, the Erie Philharmonic, the Westmoreland Symphony, the Oregon and Biava String Quartets, Concerto Soloists of Philadelphia, the Pittsburgh Chamber Music Society, and by pianists Greg Anderson, Neil Rutman, Tibor Szasz, and Leslie Spotz, violinist Maria Bachmann, and conductors Walter Hendl, Eiji Oue, Edmond de Stoutz, Ignat Solzhenitsyn, and Daniel Meyer, among others. Glinsky's music is frequently choreographed, and has been presented by the Joffrey II Company (three-season international tour), Les Grands Ballets Canadiens, Marin Ballet, Lexington Ballet, Wilkes Barre Ballet, and at universities across the U.S. He has been granted awards and honors from the National Endowment for the Arts, the American Academy of Arts and Letters (Hinrichsen Award), the Jerome Foundation, the Astral Foundation, Meet the Composer (now New Music USA), the Pennsylvania Council on the Arts, the New York State Council on the Arts, and the New York State CAPS Fellowship program. Glinsky received two awards from the Alienor International Harpsichord Competition (1986, 2004), and was a Ucross Foundation Resident Artist in Wyoming. He is a member of the American Composers Alliance.

Recognized by The American Academy of Arts and Letters, Glinsky's Hinrichsen Award citation calls his music, "vibrantly American in rhythm, accent, and in its soaring lyricism." Summing up Glinsky's work, the American conductor, Walter Hendl wrote in 1994, "I consider Albert Glinsky to be one of the finest young American Composers. . . . I performed the world premiere of his symphonic poem, 'Throne of the Third Heaven' in 1989. I have heard and seen the score of his piano concerto, and consider it to be a major contribution to the concerto literature. In my estimation, it compares most favorably with the Samuel Barber piano concerto." Glinsky's Throne of the Third Heaven is referenced in the book, Weird Virginia, which includes a section on the visionary sculpture of the same name, created by James Hampton, that inspired the composer's orchestral work.

== Books ==
Glinsky is the author of Switched On: Bob Moog and the Synthesizer Revolution, with a Foreword by Francis Ford Coppola (Oxford University Press, 2022). Switched On is the first definitive biography of the American inventor, the result of 12 years of research and exclusive access to the Moog family archives. Shortly after publication, James Hall of The Telegraph [London] called it, "[an] absorbing new biography.... a towering tribute," and the book was named a Telegraph Editorial Pick. Andy Hamilton of The Wire described it as, "a book to savour and return to," Electronic Sound called it "an inspiring read," and DownBeat included it in its Top Seven recommended holiday books of 2022. In connection with the book, Glinsky has appeared on such programs and podcasts as Echoes (PRX), Talk Radio Europe (Spain), and New Books Network.

Albert Glinsky's biography, Theremin: Ether Music and Espionage, with a Foreword by Robert Moog, was published in 2000 by the University of Illinois Press, and received positive worldwide press coverage in both print and broadcast media, ranging from the Toronto Star and The Weekly Standard to Electronic Musician magazine, Computer Music Journal, and Performance Today (National Public Radio). The London Times called it, "a fascinating rediscovery of a forgotten man, and a valuable contribution to the history of the future." The Washington Post found it, "exhaustively researched and revealing," and Larry Lipkis wrote in the Library Journal that it "approaches the writings of Alexandr Solzhenitsyn in its intensity." The American critic and composer, Kyle Gann wrote, "Albert Glinsky's Theremin: Ether Music and Espionage is the most exciting music biography I've ever read." The Wire magazine called it, "a top-flight biography destined to remain the defining portrait of its subject," and since its publication the book has become the primary resource on Leon Theremin and his work in both academic and popular spheres. The American musicologist, Richard Taruskin, referenced and quoted from Theremin in his book, Music in the Late Twentieth Century: The Oxford History of Western Music, and the book is referenced in such volumes as Cambridge Introductions to Music: Electronic Music, Electronic and Experimental Music by Thom Holmes, Analog Days by Trevor Pinch and Frank Trocco, and in numerous masters theses, doctoral dissertations, and academic papers around the world on topics ranging from electronic music histories to sensor technology and scientific and musical applications of electromagnetic fields. Theremin has also been used in required reading lists for various courses on electronic music.

The Czech playwright and director, Petr Zelenka has cited Glinsky's Theremin as a major source for his play, Teremin; American poet, David Wojahn has credited Theremin as the inspiration for his poem,Theremin: Solo and Command Performance; and Canadian author, Sean Michaels has stated that his novel Us Conductors drew its major source material from Glinsky's book. Moscow's Theremin Center director, Andrey Smirnov, quotes from Theremin in the introduction to his Generation Z exhibition which has toured in Russia, Hungary and Germany. Theremin continues to receive published reviews, the most recent appearing in Russian Life magazine.

Theremin has elicited interest from the intelligence community in connection with Leon Theremin's espionage activity. The biography is cited in the book Spies: The Rise and Fall of the KGB in America; the author was interviewed on the podcast, Spycraft 101; and Glinsky was invited to lecture at the CIA in Langley, Virginia on Leon Theremin's Great Seal Bug, also known as The Thing.

Theremin received the 2001 ASCAP Deems Taylor Award, and since the book's publication, Glinsky has been invited to present lectures on Leon Theremin and his work at many venues in the U.S. and abroad, including at the Caramoor Center for Music and the Arts, Katonah, New York, the Encuentro de Vanguardias 1er Tecnologicas y Culturales in Madrid, Spain, the Moogfest in Asheville, North Carolina, the Pittsburgh Symphony, and at American and Canadian colleges and universities. In December, 2000, Albert Glinsky appeared in a joint presentation with Bob Moog at the University of Buffalo.

Glinsky has been interviewed and featured on many nationally and internationally syndicated radio and television programs, including CBS Sunday Morning, PBS History Detectives, the Science Channel, the Discovery Channel, A&E, BBC Radio 2, BBC Radio 4, BBC World Service radio, Canada's CBC Radio and CBC Television, Public Radio International (PRI), and on theremin-related videos.

== Selected compositions ==
=== Chamber ===
- Toccata-Scherzo (violin and piano)
- Canandaigua Quartet (string quartet)
- Allegheny Quartet (string quartet)
- Masquerade: Three Tableaux after Beardsley (mixed ensemble, 10 instruments)
- Duo Sonata (bassoon and piano)

=== Vocal ===
- Twilight Serenade (mezzo-soprano and piano)
- Jubilate Deo (high voice and piano)
- Prothalamion (mezzo-soprano and string quartet)
- High Flight (soprano and piano)

=== Choral ===
- Tor House (a cappella choir)
- Mass (children's voices or women's choir; 4 cellos and piano)
- Psalm 103 (SATB and organ)
- O Magnum Mysterium (SATB choir and organ)
- Morning Star (SA choir and organ or piano)

=== Orchestral ===
- Sun Chanter (full orchestra)
- Piano Concerto (piano and full orchestra)
- Throne of the Third Heaven (full orchestra)
- Rhapsody for Solo Violin, Flute, Strings, and Timpani (chamber orchestra)
- Clarion Concerto (wind ensemble)
- Corona: Fanfare for a New Millennium (full orchestra)

=== Solo works ===
- Sunbow (harpsichord)
- Six Miniatures for Solo Violin (violin)
- Elegy (piano)
- 1968 (a Fantasy-Improvisation) (piano)
- Apparition (piano)
- Silver Blue (piano)
- Isla del Encanto (Four Pictures of Puerto Rico) (piano)

=== Electronic works ===
- Timescape
- Timescape II
- Spatial Fantasy
- The Ride
- Day Walker, Night Wanderer (electronic score)
