= Patchin Place =

Street in Manhattan, New York

Coordinates: 40.73499°N 73.99931°W

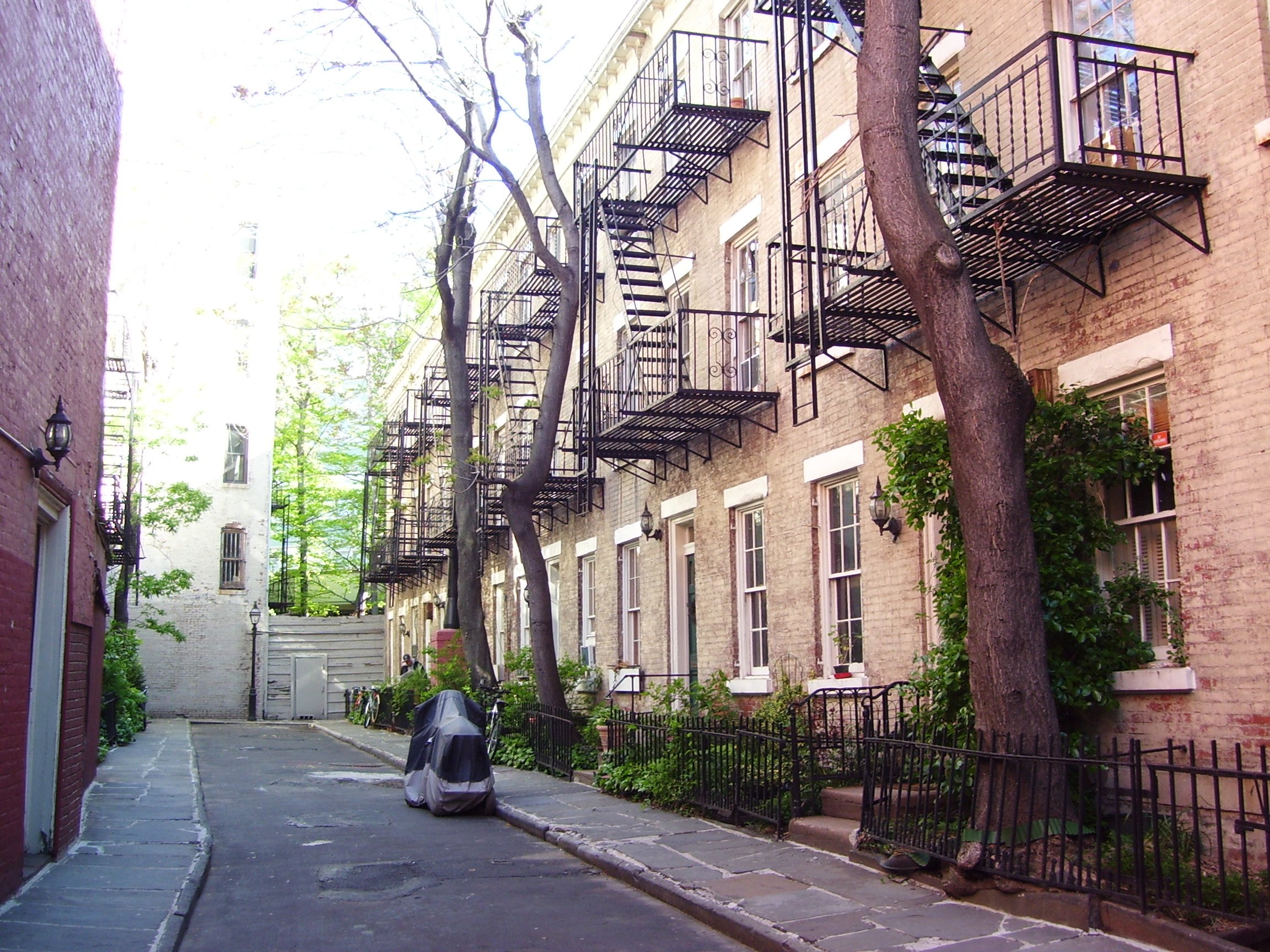
Patchin Place in 2011

Patchin Place is a gated cul-de-sac located off of 10th Street between Greenwich Avenue and the Avenue of the Americas (Sixth Avenue) in the Greenwich Village neighborhood of Manhattan, New York City. Its ten 3-story brick row houses, said to have been originally built as housing for the Basque staff of the nearby Brevoort House hotel, have been home to several famous writers, including Theodore Dreiser, E. E. Cummings, John Cowper Powys and Djuna Barnes, making it a stop on Greenwich Village walking tours. Today it is a popular location for psychotherapists' offices.

== History ==
The property that became Patchin Place was once part of a farm belonging to Sir Peter Warren. In 1799 it was sold to Samuel Milligan, who later conveyed it to his son-in-law, Aaron Patchin. The buildings that now occupy the site were put up in 1848 or 1849. Many guide books say the buildings were intended to be boarding houses for Basque waiters and other workers at the Brevoort House hotel on Fifth Avenue, but the Brevoort was not built until 1855. The rooms were small, and at the time, the street was noisy due to its proximity to the vendors in Jefferson Market.

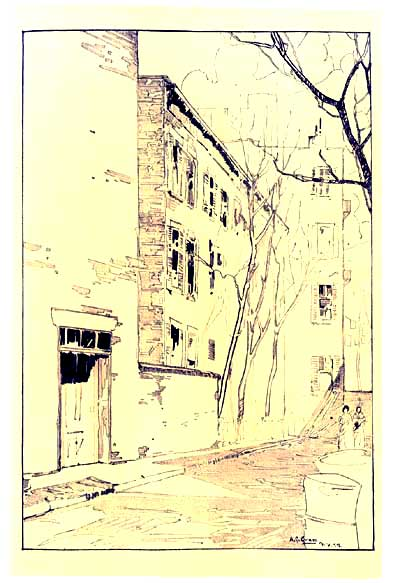
The 1917 book about Greenwich Village in which this illustration first appeared described Patchin Place as "one of the strange little 'lost courts' given over to the Villagers and their pursuits".

In the early 20th century, Patchin Place became popular with writers and artists, with its small residences, that were apart from but still accessible to the cafe life of the Village. Indoor plumbing, electricity, and steam heat were added in 1917. In 1920, Grace I. Patchin Stuart, the last remaining member of the Patchin family, sold the property to the Land Map Realty Corporation, and the houses were converted into small apartments. E. E. Cummings moved in three years later; he wrote that "the topfloorback room at 4 Patchin Place ... meant Safety & Peace & the truth of Dreaming & the bliss of Work".

In 1929 the gate at the entrance was added and nearby Jefferson Market prison was torn down, as Patchin Place resident John Cowper Powys noted in a letter to his brother:

They've gone and put up iron gates at the entrance to Patchin Place — in the middle of the entrance — leaving the little openings by the new brick posts free. And they've pulled down the Prison — but so far not the Clock tower. In the foundations of this fallen Bastille, from where of so many Sundays we heard the imprisoned Baggages sing about heaven, is an iron clutcher with a dragonish dew-lap scooping earth and hissing with a steamy vibrant roar. I am deaf of one ear — but this noise is very strident. But do you know we can now see the Woolworth tower and also the Singer Tower from the entrance of Patchin Place....

The clock tower that Powys refers to is Jefferson Market Court, now a library branch. Berenice Abbott photographed the view of the tower above Patchin Place in 1937.

The modernist writer Djuna Barnes, a friend of Abbott's, moved into a room-and-a-half apartment at #5 Patchin Place in 1941. She had lived in Greenwich Village in the 1910s and had been in the audience when residents organized a performance of William Butler Yeats's play The King's Threshold in the courtyard of Patchin Place as a war benefit, but had spent most of the 1920s and 30s in Europe. After her return to New York she became so reclusive that Cummings would occasionally check on her by shouting out his window "Are you still alive, Djuna?" Yet in 1963, when a developer proposed to tear down the houses on Patchin and nearby Milligan Place in order to put up a high-rise apartment building, she left her apartment to tell a protest meeting that she would die if she had to move, and, less helpfully, that the destruction of the neighborhood would leave local youths with nowhere to practice their mugging. Community activists, led by future mayor Ed Koch, succeeded in saving Patchin Place, and in 1969 it became landmarked with the creation of the Greenwich Village Historic District. Though she complained about "writing amid the roaring of plumbing, howling of downstairs dog, thumping of small child on elephant's feet", Barnes remained in residence until her death in 1982.

== Present day ==
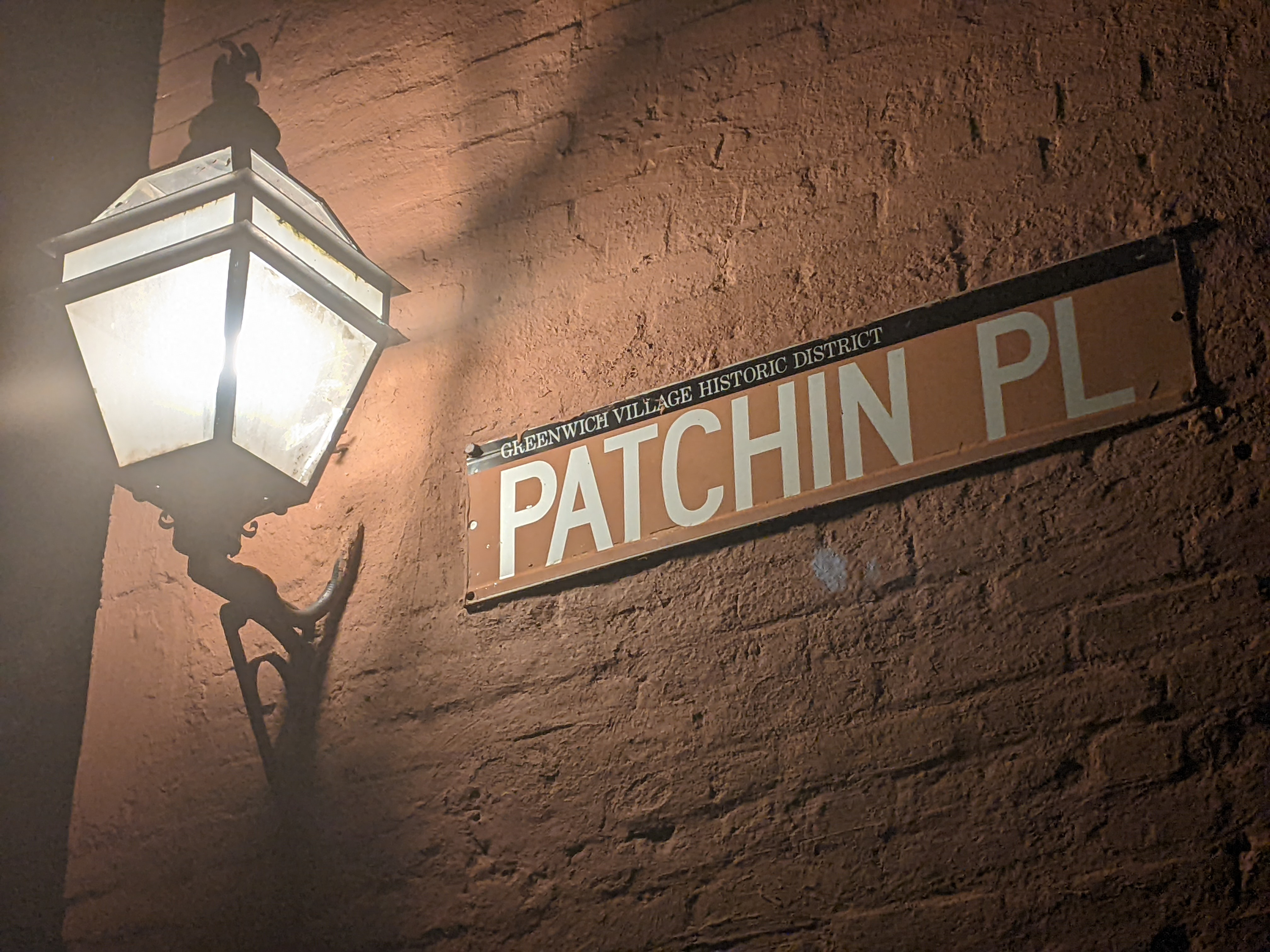
Patchin Place street sign

Patchin Place remains physically almost unchanged. It even retains its 19th-century gas street lamp—one of only two in New York City, and the only one that still gives light, though the light is now electric. Usage has changed, however: the same privacy that had once attracted writers and artists also appealed to psychotherapists, who began to locate there in the 1990s, transforming the street into what one psychologist called "therapy row". As of 2003, Patchin Place was home to about 35 residents and 15 therapists' offices.

In March 2022, investment firm Firebird Grove bought all 11 buildings in Patchin Place from Morgan Holding Capital for just over $32 million.

== Notable residents ==
- Djuna Barnes (#5, 1941–1982)
- Ralph Albert Blakelock (#1, 1853–1861, as a child)
- Randolph Bourne
- Marlon Brando (ca. 1943, while rooming with his sister, Jocelyn)
- William Brinkley
- Louise Bryant (#1, with John Reed)
- E. E. Cummings (#4, 1923–1962)
- Theodore Dreiser
- Vincent Glinsky (#9, 1951–1975)
- Alyse Gregory
- Cleo Hartwig (#9, 1951–1988)
- Anthony Harvey (#9)
- Harold Hersey
- John Howard Lawson (16 years)
- John Masefield
- John Cowper Powys (#4, 1923–1929)
- Charles Platt (#9, 1970-, published The Patchin Review)
- John Reed (#1, with Louise Bryant, began writing Ten Days That Shook the World there)
