= Elsie Joy Davison =

British aviator, mechanic and businesswoman

- Born: Elsie Joy Muntz; 14 March 1910
- Died: 8 July 1940 (aged 30)
- Cause of death: Aircraft crash
- Occupations: Aviator, businesswoman
- Spouse: William Frank Davison (1933–1939)

Elsie Joy Davison (née Muntz; 14 March 1910 – 18 July 1940) was a Canadian-born British aviator and airline director. She started flying herself in 1929. After becoming a director of an aircraft company in 1936, she died serving with the Air Transport Auxiliary in 1940, and was killed along with her instructor during a training flight, becoming the first female British aviator to die in World War II.

== Early life ==
Elsie Joy Muntz was born on 14 March 1910 in Toronto, Ontario. Her older sisters were Elizabeth Muntz a sculptor and Isabelle Hope Muntz, a medievalist and author. She was known as Joy, and signed herself as ‘E. Joy Davison’ in later life. After her father died in an accident when she was young, she moved with her mother and sister Hope to the United Kingdom.

Interested in aviation and mechanics since childhood, she started flying in 1929 and gained her flying certificate by age 20. Flight magazine of 23 May 1930 listed her gaining her Royal Aero Club Aviator's Certificate No.9053 from London Aero Club. By the time she was 23, she was already a well-known pilot in her local area. Davison was recorded holding a "Commercial B" license from the Air Ministry.

She was a member of the Women's Engineering Society and first worked at De Havilland and several other companies as a mechanic before starting to fly for the Comper Aircraft Company.

== Marriage and commercial activity ==
In 1933, she married William Frank Davison (1899–1949) who she met while flying him for his photography work for the Liverpool Dock Board. Frank bought Hooton Airfield in 1934 and founded Utility Airways Ltd. there in 1936, with both him and his wife as directors. The pair divorced in 1939 and Frank would then go on to marry English pilot and sailor Ann Davison.

That year, Davison worked for a company flying from Portsmouth to Cardiff. When World War II broke out, she started working for National Air Communications (NAC). She was listed as living with her sisters in Apple Tree Cottage in East Chaldon, Dorset in 1939 when the 1939 Register was taken.

When she learned about the Air Transport Auxiliary (ATA), she wrote to Pauline Gower to inquire about working there but turned a first offer down because the pay was too low. A second letter to Gower explained "Sorry old thing, but I fear the dough isn’t good enough, particularly considering one would be flying open cockpit stuff for a large majority of the time! Afraid I’m getting soft or old or something, but when I’ve got a job which pays about twice as well and where one earns one’s money in more or less comfort, the change offers no worthwhile attractions!".

== Air Transport Auxiliary service and death ==
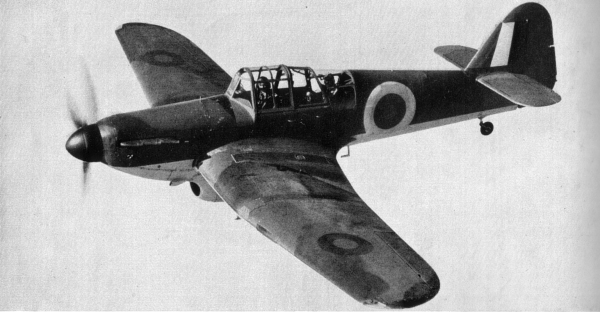
Davison trained and crashed with a Miles Master Mk. I (example pictured)

After the expansion of the ATA and bored with her job at the NAC, Davison decided to join the women's section of the Air Transport Auxiliary on 1 July 1940. The ATA was tasked with transporting newly produced aircraft from the factories to their respective Royal Air Force bases. She went to Central Flying School in Upavon and was assigned an experienced instructor named Sergeant Francis L'Estrange.

Davison and L'Estrange took flight on 8 July 1940 in a Miles Master but on their return to base, the aircraft made a spiral dive and crashed into the ground to the shock of spectators who did not believe anything was wrong until the crash. Both Davison and L'Estrange died during this instruction flight, making Davison the country's first woman aviator to die during World War II. Contemporary sources speculated that carbon monoxide had leaked into the cockpit and rendered both pilots unconscious prior to the crash but no official reason for the crash was ever given.

Joy Davison was cremated at Arnos Vale Cemetery, in Bristol and is commemorated in the Commonwealth War Graves section there.
