= Mr. Weston's Good Wine =

1927 novel by T. F. Powys

- First edition
- Author: T. F. Powys
- Language: English
- Genres: Novel, Allegory
- Publisher: Chatto and Windus
- Publication date: 1927
- Publication place: United Kingdom
- Media type: Print (Hardcover)
- OCLC: 652411449
- Followed by: Unclay (1931)

Mr. Weston's Good Wine is a novel by T. F. Powys, first published in 1927.

It describes an evening in 1923 when Mr. Weston, who is apparently a wine merchant, but is evidently God, visits the fictional village of Folly Down in Dorset, and meets some of its individuals, whose backgrounds and lives leading up to this day are described during the course of the novel. Mr. Weston's colleague is named Michael, which is an allusion to the Archangel. For a while time stands still, and these individuals, according to their possessing qualities of good or evil, find their ultimate reward.

The fictitious village of Folly Down in this novel and other works by T. F. Powys is based on Chaldon Herring, where he lived from 1904 until 1940.

== Summary ==
In the early evening of 20 November 1923, Mr. Weston and his younger colleague Michael drive in their Ford van to the top of a hill overlooking the village of Folly Down; Michael switches on a lighting system connected to the vehicle's battery, and the phrase "Mr. Weston's Good Wine" is displayed in the sky. Michael, reading from a book, reads aloud to Mr. Weston the names and background of some of the village's inhabitants, and Mr. Weston considers the likelihood of each one purchasing his wine.

=== The villagers, and their history up to this evening ===
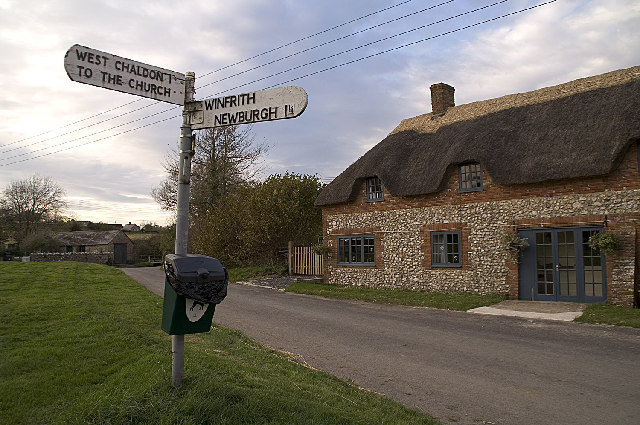
East Chaldon, or Chaldon Herring, Dorset, where Powys lived from 1904 to 1940, was the inspiration for the fictitious village of Folly Down, in Mr Weston and other works.

As described by Michael to Mr. Weston, or described later in the novel:

Mr. Mumby is the local squire at Oak-tree Farm; his sons are Martin and John. Mr. Kiddle is a cattle dealer; his daughters are Phoebe and Anne. Ada Kiddle, the eldest daughter, was taken by Martin and John Mumby one summer under the oak tree on the green, with the encouragement of Mrs. Vosper, and drowned herself when winter came. Mrs. Vosper, who likes to see that girls are taken by men under the oak tree, encouraged the same to happen to Phoebe and Anne.

The Rev. Nicholas Grobe lives at the rectory, with Tamar his daughter, who believes that an angel will come to her. She fell in love with the angel on the signboard of the Angel Inn. Mr. Grobe has not believed in God since his wife Alice died. She was killed when a card depicting an angel, which Tamar had bought when in town with her mother, fell onto a railway line and Alice tried to retrieve it. Mr. Grobe often sits alone in his study in the evening; he misses his wife, although she used to tease him by dancing in front of him.

Thomas Bunce is landlord of the Angel Inn; he blames God for everything. His daughter Jenny is a domestic servant at the rectory; she wants to marry Luke Bird. Luke Bird was once a brewer's clerk, but he preached against drink and lost his job; he came to live in Folly Down and started converting the farm animals to Christianity. He wants to marry Jenny Bunce.

Mr. Grunter, the parish clerk, has a reputation as the village's lover, and is blamed when village girls are ravished.

=== This evening ===
Mrs. Vosper takes Jenny Bunce to the oak tree, saying that Martin Mumby wants to show her a bird. Martin and his brother John are there; but before anything can happen, there is an interruption and Jenny escapes.

In the Angel Inn, Mr. Mumby, Mr. Kiddle, Mr. Meek the local shopkeeper and Mr. Bunce the landlord talk about whether it is Mr. Grunter or God who is responsible for the babies in the village. They notice that the time has stopped at 7 o'clock. Mr. Weston comes in; each one there thinks they know him, and is perhaps a relation; they are happy in his company. He is aware of the topic they were discussing. Mr. Bunce serves him a glass of beer; while he drinks, they seem to hear someone say, "I form the light, and create darkness: I make peace, and create evil: I, the lord, do all these things." Before he leaves, Mr. Weston advises Mr Bunce to go to the Rev. Grobe for an answer to the question discussed.

Mr. Bunce does so, and asks whether it is God or Mr. Grunter who causes the mischief in Folly Down; Mr. Grobe tells him that God does not exist.

Luke Bird goes to the Angel Inn and asks Mr. Bunce if he can marry Jenny; Bunce replies that he can if there is wine in the well near Luke's cottage. After Luke leaves he meets Jenny in a lane and asks her to love him, but she runs off; he wonders if he should be brutal, like the way the Mumby sons ill-treat their horses.

Tamar, who is wearing a wedding dress, meets Mr. Weston near the green; he tells her to go to the oak tree where she will meet a young man; she meets Michael there, who is her angel from the inn signboard. They are married at the church, Mr. Weston officiating, and then go to the oak tree on the green.

Luke Bird waits for Mr. Weston, with all the money he has, to buy wine to fill the well; Mr. Weston visits him and makes the sale, telling him to go to the well. Luke goes there with Mr. Bunce and the well is full of wine. Jenny is in Mr. Weston's van; Luke takes her to his home.

Mr. Weston takes Martin and John Mumby to the church, saying he has wine there for them; he shows them the body of Ada Kiddle. Martin and John are angered and they go away. Thinking they are being chased by a lion, they hide in Mrs. Vosper's house. Phoebe and Anne Kiddle are there, being insulted by her. Mrs. Vosper, believing a beast is approaching, dies of fright.

Mr. Grunter, who went to the church when he noticed it was lit for the wedding, and disinterred the grave of Ada Kiddle for Mr. Weston, walks to the inn; on his way he sees the oak tree. He did not ravish any village girls; aware of what happened to Ada Kiddle under the oak tree, he curses it. Lightning strikes the tree and it falls; Tamar, who is there, is struck by the lightning, and Michael carries her to the sky.

Mr. Weston visits Mr. Grobe and describes his wine; Mr. Grobe says he will buy a bottle. After Mr. Weston has left, he finds a flagon of wine where the bible used to be; drinking, he is filled with gentle melancholy. The bottle is still full, and he drinks more. Later, he finds the flagon of wine is a bible again. Mr. Weston returns, with some dark wine; he says he will see his wife Alice again if he drinks. Mr. Grobe, drinking this wine, dies.

Time starts again in Folly Down as Mr. Weston leaves in his van. Mr. Bunce, finding he has no beer in his barrels, blames not God but Mr. Weston. On the hilltop over Folly Down, Mr. Weston and Michael look at the village, as dawn approaches. Mr. Weston asks Michael to drop a burning match into the van's petrol tank; in the smoke, they disappear into the sky.

== The title ==
The title comes from the novel Emma by Jane Austen. A character in the novel has the name Mr. Weston; in chapter 15 is the sentence: "She believed he had been drinking too much of Mr. Weston's good wine, and felt sure that he would want to be talking nonsense."

== Bibliography ==
Buning, Marius, T.F. Powys, a modern allegorist: the companion novels Mr. Weston's good wine and Unclay in the light of modern allegorical theory. Amsterdam: Rodopi, 1986.
