= Elizabeth Muntz =

- Born: 26 October 1894; Toronto, Canada
- Died: March 1977 (aged 82); Dorset
- Known for: Sculptor, painter

Elizabeth Muntz (26 October 1894 – March 1977) was a Canadian-born artist based in Dorset, noted for her sculptures and paintings.

== Early life and education ==
Elizabeth W. Muntz was born in Toronto, Canada on 26 October 1894 and attended Bishop Strachan School. Her aunt, to whom she was close, was the Canadian painter of women and children, Laura Muntz Lyall. Elizabeth Muntz studied at Ontario College of Art before attending the Académie de la Grande Chaumière in Paris.

Her younger sisters were Isabelle Hope Muntz a renowned medievalist and author and pilot E. Joy Davison, the first female British aviator to die in World War II, whilst working for the Air Transport Auxiliary. They lived together in Apple Tree Cottage in East Chaldon, Dorset as the family moved back to Britain after the death of their father.

== Sculpture and painting ==
While in Paris, Muntz studied with Antoine Bourdelle, and is considered part of the Maillolesque tradition. Muntz arrived in England in the mid-1920s and while in London, she studied under Frank Dobson.

Muntz was a member of The Artist-Craftsmen Group in 1926 followed by the London Group, later becoming a member of the Isle of Purbeck Arts Club. She exhibited regularly at London Group Exhibitions between 1923 and 1938, also showing her work in 1926 at The Modern Group of Artist-Craftsmen Second Exhibition and with the Seven and Five Society at the Beaux Arts Gallery the same year. In May 1932, Muntz exhibited drawings and sculpture at the Cooling Gallery, London. In the 1950s Muntz exhibited at the Society of Women Artists in 1952, The Exhibition of the Royal Academy of Arts from 1952 to 1955, and the Royal Glasgow Institute in 1954 and 1955. In the 1960s, Muntz was commissioned to create a sculpture of King Harold for Waltham Abbey, Essex.

During the 1930s, Muntz's work was featured several times in Apollo Magazine.

Locals from the area around her Dorset home were known to sit for her as models. In the 1960s, Muntz ran a summer school, employing sculptors including Alan Collins.

A memorial stone to Llewelyn Powys carved by Muntz, who lived in a neighbouring village, is located on the Dorset Cliffs.

Muntz was the first elected woman freeman of The Ancient Order of Purbeck Marblers and Stone Cutters.

== Works held in Collections ==
Paintings and sculptures by Elizabeth Muntz are held in several British collections, including the following works,

| Title | Year | Medium | Gallery no. | Gallery | Location |
|---|---|---|---|---|---|
| Adriatic Schooner Moored at a Quay (probably Venice) | - | oil on board | 1993.285.234 | Dorset Museum | Dorchester, England |
| Bust of T. F. Powys | 1949 or before | stone | N4894 | Bristol City Museum and Art Gallery | Bristol, England |
| Catherine Morton (1929–1988) | 1970 | oil on canvas | ART2321 | Dorset Museum | Dorchester, England |
| Child in a Hammock | - | oil on board | 1993.285.282 | Dorset Museum | Dorchester, England |
| Children by the Shore | - | oil on canvas | ART2461.1 | Dorset Museum | Dorchester, England |
| Figure on a Beach | - | oil on board | 1993.285.281A | Dorset Museum | Dorchester, England |
| House in a Landscape | - | oil on board | 1993.285.229.1 | Dorset Museum | Dorchester, England |
| Figure on a Boat in a Harbour | - | oil on board | 1993.285.233 | Dorset Museum | Dorchester, England |
| Erda | 1933 | bronze | 1933.14 | Manchester Art Gallery | Manchester, England |
