= Cleo Hartwig =

American sculptor (1907–1988)

- Cleo Hartwig carving wood, 1948
- Born: October 20, 1907 (Birth date is often incorrectly listed as 1911); Webberville, Michigan, U.S.
- Died: June 18, 1988 (aged 80); New York City, New York City, U.S.
- Alma mater: Western Michigan University
- Known for: Sculpture
- Spouse: Vincent Glinsky
- Children: Albert Glinsky

Cleo Hartwig (20 October 1907 – 18 June 1988) was an American sculptor who worked in stone, wood, terra cotta, plaster, paper, woodcut, and ceramic. She won a number of awards, including national awards, and her work is exhibited across the northeast U.S. She is regarded as a member of The New York School.

== Early life and education ==
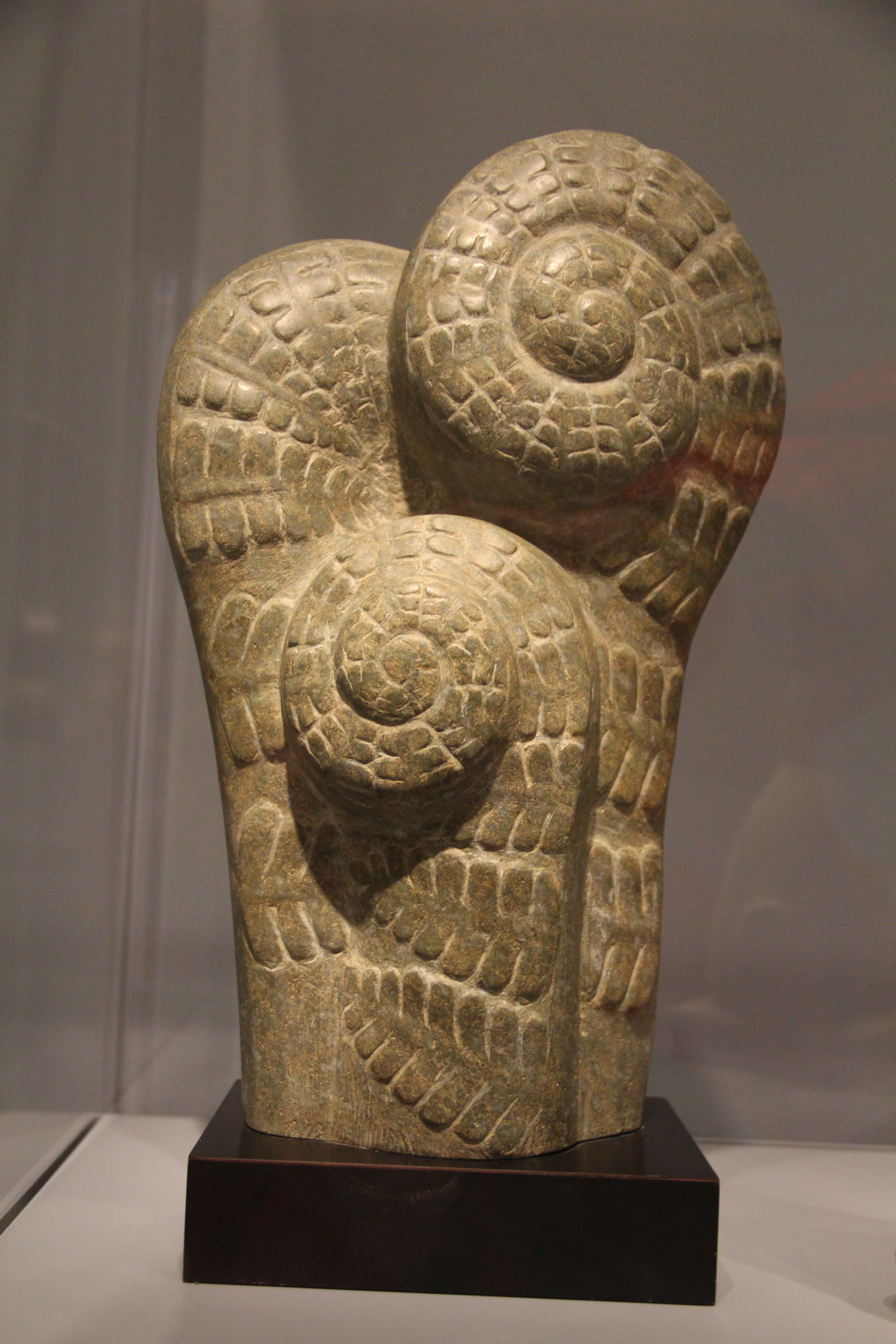
Fern — 1981, serpentine marble sculpture

Cleo Hartwig was born in Webberville, Michigan, on October 20, 1907.

Hartwig attended Portland High School between 1921 and 1925, and entered Western State Teachers College (now Western Michigan University) in 1926. She interrupted her studies to teach art at Holland Junior High School (1926 to 1929), and take summer art classes at Chicago Art Institute (1930, 1931). She returned to WSTC to graduate with an A.B. in 1932.

== Career ==
After graduation, she settled in New York City, finding employment as a teacher at The Town School (1934 to 1936). During the summer of 1935 she studied art in Poland, Hungary, Rumania, and Germany. Hartwig then taught at the Ecole Francaise (1936 to 1939) in New York, and exhibited for the first time in New York at The National Academy of Design (113th Annual, 1938). In 1939 she made a summer trip to France to study art, but returned home hastily because of the growing hostilities. Hartwig took up residence at Patchin Place, the historic Greenwich Village cul-de-sac, home to many famous artists of the early 20th century. (She remained at that address until her death). She joined the faculty of the Lenox School (1939–42), and exhibited her work in group shows at the Clay Club, National Academy of Design, Syracuse University, and Mt. Holyoke College. She was also part of the 1942 “Artists for Victory” exhibit at the Metropolitan Museum of Art.

After summer art study in Mexico (1941), Hartwig began to incorporate gestures from that country's culture into her work. "Her carvings from the 1930s and early 1940s,” noted Ilene Fort, of the LA County Museum of Art, “are characterized by compact, massive forms, crisp outlines, and minimal details. In their blockiness, extreme simplification of shape, and coarse surfaces they especially echo Mesoamerican sculpture."

During World War II Hartwig did drafting at Bell Telephone Laboratories (1942 to 1943), and technical illustrating at the Jordanoff Aviation Corp in NY (1943–45). During this time, she held her first solo New York exhibition (Clay Club, 1943), and became active in many arts organizations. She was an early member of the National Association of Women Artists (eventually becoming vice president), and the New York Society of Women Artists (Recording Secretary). At that time she also began her long association with the Sculptors Guild (Exec. Dir., Exec. Bd., Exec. VP), Audubon Artists (VP for Sculpture, Exhibition Committee), and New York Society of Ceramic Artists (Sculpture Jury).

The National Association of Women Artists (NAWA) awarded Hartwig the Anna Hyatt Huntington Prize for her Mandolin Player in 1945. That same year she exhibited with the Pennsylvania Academy of the Fine Arts, National Academy of Design, National Association of Women Artists, Audubon Artists, and New York Society of Ceramic Artists. She also became a sculpture instructor at Cooper Union in New York and the Montclair Art Museum in New Jersey. In addition, she completed an important work for the architect Kenneth B. Norton: a "Family Group" for the Continental Companies Building on Williams St. in downtown Manhattan. For that commission Hartwig created an 8-foot-high bas-relief of a mother, father, and child, which was cast in aluminum and installed on the front of the building.

In 1951, Hartwig married fellow sculptor, Vincent Glinsky (1895–1975). Their son, Albert Glinsky, was born the following year. Throughout the 1950s she continued to teach, complete commissions (S.S. United States), and win prizes (including several from NAWA; Artists Equity; Audubon Artists; Munson Proctor Institute). In addition, Western Michigan University awarded her an Honorary master's degree (1951).

During the 1960s, Hartwig participated in the annual shows of the Sculptors Guild, exhibited her alabaster “Sea Foam” at the 1964 New York World's Fair, and took part in the Bryant Park outdoor exhibits in midtown Manhattan. She worked with reproduction houses (Alva Museum Replicas, Sculpture Collectors, Collectors Guild) and executed a commission for the All-Faiths Memorial Tower in NJ (now George Washington Memorial Park). Her sculptural methods were examined in a feature article in American Artist magazine.

In the 1970s, Hartwig continued to collect honors: she was elected to the National Academy of Design as an Academician (1971) and received an Honorary Doctorate from Western Michigan University (1973). That same decade her work won awards from the National Sculpture Society, Sculptors Guild, National Association of Women Artists, Audubon Artists, and National Academy of Design. She had a solo show at the Montclair Art Museum (1971) and two joint shows with her husband, Vincent Glinsky (Sculpture Center, NY, 1972; Fairfield University, CT, 1974).

During the last decade of her life (1980s), Hartwig exhibited in more shows than in any previous decade—58 in all. Her "Owlet," shown at the New York Botanical Garden's Conservatory, was also featured in The New York Times. She was invited to serve on juries around the country, including the 4th North American Sculpture Exhibition, for which she was co-juror with Francisco Zúñiga. She received more awards, gave masterclasses, and continued to sculpt until just months before her death. Hartwig died on June 18, 1988, in New York City. After she died the Sculptors Guild dedicated its 1990 Hofstra University Exhibit Catalog to her memory, and the Audubon Society instituted an annual sculpture prize (still given today), in her honor.

== Legacy ==
Hartwig belongs to a line of 'direct carvers' (taille direct) which includes both Jose de Creeft, with whom she studied, and Vincent Glinsky, her husband. With this technique the artist carves directly into the materials, without the use of intermediary steps. The conception and execution of the work is influenced by the density, veining, color, texture, and shape of the material.

Hartwig belongs to the generation of the 1930s and 1940s who advanced opportunities for women artists. She was an early member of the National Association of Women Artists (eventually serving as vice president), and the New York Society of Women Artists (eventually serving as Recording Secretary). She is regarded as a member of The New York School, and her work was featured in the TV documentary, Women of the First Wave; Elders of the Century. Hartwig's papers are held at the Smithsonian Institution's Archives of American Art. Her works are in such collections as the Brookgreen Gardens in South Carolina, and the Smithsonian American Art Museum.
