= Dorset Innovation Park =

Science park in Dorset, England

Coordinates: 50°40′57″N 2°15′56″W

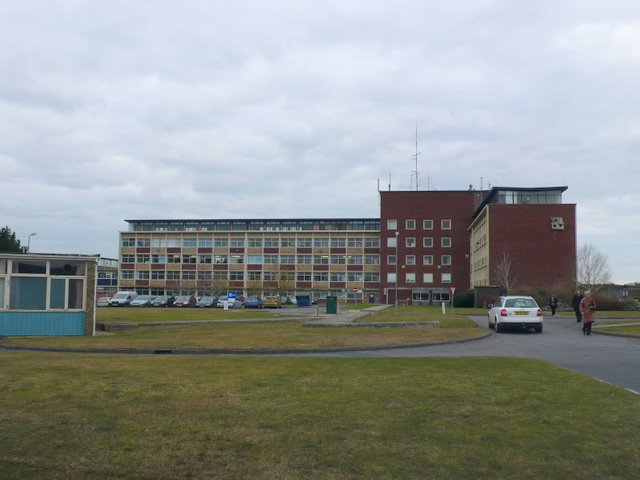

Dorset Innovation Park (formerly Dorset Green Technology Park, and earlier known as Winfrith Technology Centre) is a science and technology park which is owned by the Homes and Communities Agency. The site was the former UKAEA Winfrith Atomic Energy Establishment which was in service from the 1950s to the early 1990s. The Steam Generating Heavy Water Reactor was also developed at the site.

The centre is situated near the village of Winfrith Newburgh, which is some eight miles (13 km) west of Wareham and nine miles (14 km) east of Dorchester.

It is now home to the Defence BattleLab, which was officially opened in May 2022.

== History ==
=== Winfrith Technology Centre ===
Winfrith Technology Centre dates from the 1980s when part of the UKAEA site was already being referred to by that name. It was used as a research and development centre in support of the nuclear, oil and gas industries.

By the early 21st century, under the ownership of UKAEA, the centre was home to about 50 companies including defence technology company QinetiQ which operated its underwater technology business there. QinetiQ would later sell its underwater technology division to Atlas Elektronik in 2009, whilst still remaining a tenant at Winfrith.

In 2004 Winfrith Technology Centre was sold to the UK government's regeneration agency English Partnerships for £7.54 million. English Partnerships' ownership passed to its successor body, the Homes and Communities Agency, in December 2008.

=== Dorset Green Technology Park ===
In early 2008 English Partnerships appointed Zog Brownfield Ventures (ZBV) to redevelop the six acres (2.4 hectares) of land at the site. The intention was "to create an eco-friendly business complex". By 2009 the site was being called the Dorset Green Technology Park. There were major plans to expand and redevelop the site.

ZBV faced challenges in making the site financially viable, due to high security costs for the gatehouse and 24-hour security. There was limited business interest in the site other than for very small-scale projects.

Zog Brownfield Ventures ceased trading in June 2014.

=== Dorset Innovation Park ===
In 2018 the site was relaunched as the Dorset Innovation Park. The launch coincided with "the completion of 20 new employment units".

=== Defence BattleLab ===
The Dorset Innovation Park is also the site of a multi-million pound investment by the Ministry of Defence, Dorset LEP and Dorset Council as a "Collaboration Nerve Centre" to bring UK Armed Forces and their challenges to an ecosystem that will attract traditional defence suppliers, academics, subject matter experts, and small- to medium-sized businesses who may or may not already be suppliers to this sector.

The Defence BattleLab was officially opened in May 2022.

== Land Sales ==
Dorset Council agreed to the sale of a two acre plot at Dorset Innovation Park to Norco GRP in November 2019. The site will be used for the manufacture of composites. This is Norco's second site in south Dorset. In 2025, the Council agreed to the sale of a further three acres of land to enable Norco to continue to expand.

Three acres of land was sold to Draper Vent for £1.7m in 2020. The land was sold for the building of a research and innovation centre to further develop computerised climate control systems for the agricultural sector.

== Employment plans ==
Following an application partly developed by Purbeck District Council with the support of the Homes and Communities Authority (the owners), the site was granted Enterprise Zone status in 2015, thus enabling the local enterprise partnership (Dorset LEP) to retain 100% of the uplift in business rates for 25 years to invest in local economic growth. 2,000 new jobs are forecast to created by 2040.

In June 2016, the Council approved a proposal to build a digital hub innovation centre, which included conference, meeting, and catering facilities. The total project cost was forecast to be £8.17 million. The two staffing models considered included a managing agent or local authority-run service. Plans were later shelved when the LEP confirmed they were unable to support the plans.

By 2017, local councillors were predicting that the site would be a white elephant. It was reported that business interest was not for new start ups but for the relocation of existing businesses from within Dorset.

== Site Management ==
In 2016, the District Council examined options for managing the Park. Options included a managing agent, local authority operation or contracted out service.

Following financial challenges, Dorset Council has confirmed the transfer of park management to a newly established Council-owned company. Secured through a loan, this company aims to transform an operating loss of £250,000 into a profit by 2030.
