= Rosemary Manning =

British writer (1911–1988)

- in 1985 campaigning for gay rights
- Born: 9 December 1911; Weymouth
- Died: 15 April 1988 (aged 76); Royal Tunbridge Wells
- Writing career
- Pen name: Sarah Davys; Mary Voyle
- Genres: Adult and children books

Rosemary Joy Manning (9 December 1911 – 15 April 1988) was a British writer of both adult and children's books. Her best-known novel is The Chinese Garden, an important British lesbian novel. She was also well known for her popular Dragon children's series. She was also known by the pseudonyms Sarah Davys and Mary Voyle.

== Early life ==
Manning was born on 9 December 1911 to Thomas Davys Manning and Mary Ann Coles in Weymouth, Dorset. Her father was a doctor, but he had to resign his practice following a scandal; the family then moved to Sandhurst, Berkshire. Manning was sent to boarding school at Poltimore College in Poltimore House, Devon; her experiences there would later influence The Chinese Garden. She studied at Royal Holloway College from 1930 to 1933 and graduated with a second class honours degree in Classics.

== Career ==
She first worked in an Oxford Street department store then as a secretary. In the 1930s, unhappy at work she suffered a nervous breakdown and was unsuccessfully treated at the Maudsley Hospital by unsympathetic doctors due to her lesbianism. Her former headmistress offered her teaching work and she stayed as a teacher for a further 35 years. In 1950 she moved with a friend to Hampstead, North London, to take over St Christopher's School, a long-established girls' preparatory school, where she became headmistress.

In 1962 she broke up with her partner, and in April she tried to kill herself using the drug Luminal. However a suicide note was delivered promptly by the post office and help arrived. She was sad to find that she had failed. Later that year she published The Chinese Garden which is mentioned above. The book is considered important as a lesbian novel.

After retirement, she came out as a lesbian during a television interview in 1980. In 1985 when the Greater London Council launched their Changing the World Lesbian and Gay Charter Manning was there at the launch. She appeared with Miriam Margolyes, Valerie Wise, Ken Livingstone, Jenni Fletcher and Jimmy Somerville.

She died in Tunbridge Wells in 1988.

== Publications ==
=== Novels & Autobiography ===
- Remaining A Stranger (1953) - writing as Mary Voyle
- A Change of Direction (1955) - writing as Mary Voyle
- Look, Stranger (1960) - appeared as The Shape of Innocence in the USA
- The Chinese Garden (1962); New York : Feminist Press at the City University of New York, 2000, ISBN 1-55861-216-5
- Man on a Tower (1965)
- A Time and A Time (1971) - autobiography, writing as Sarah Davys
- Open the Door (1983)
- A Corridor of Mirrors (1987) - autobiography

=== Dragon series ===
- Green Smoke (1957)
- Dragon in Danger (1959)
- The Dragon's Quest (1961)
- The Dragon in the Harbour (1980)

=== Poem & Short Stories ===
- 'Quietus' (1936) - poem in The New Statesman vol. 11, issue 264
- 'The Fox' (1948) - in Horizon No. 108
- 'Sunday Afternoon Walk' (1953) - writing as Mary Voyle in Cornhill Magazine
- 'Over the Plain' (1954) - writing as Mary Voyle in Cornhill Magazine
- 'Alone in the House' (1962) - in Transatlantic Review No. 10

=== Other Work for Children ===
- The Shepherd's Play and Noah and the Flood: Two Miracle Plays Arranged for Young People (1955)
- Arripay (1963) - historical novel
- Boney Was A Warrior (1966) - historical novel
- Heraldry (1966)
- A Grain of Sand: Poems for Young Readers (1967) - selection and introduction to the poems of William Blake
- The Rocking Horse (1970)
- Great Expectations (1970) - abridged by Manning
- Railways and Railwaymen (1977)
