= Unclay =

1931 novel by T. F. Powys

- Cover of the 2018 edition by New Directions
- Author: T. F. Powys
- Language: English
- Genres: Novel, Allegory
- Publisher: Chatto & Windus
- Publication date: 1931
- Publication place: United Kingdom
- ISBN: 9780811228206

Unclay is an allegorical novel written by English writer T. F. Powys, first published in 1931. This was the last novel published during Powys' life.

In the novel, a personified Death arrives in an obscure village with a parchment detailing his assignment. After losing the document, Death decides to stay in the village for a vacation and to personally observe human life.

== Background ==
The word "unclay" that gives the title to Powys's novel comes from a poem by Jeremy Taylor, the 17th century Anglican divine and author of The Rule and Exercises of Holy Dying (1651), which was an influence.

== Plot ==
Death arrives to the obscure village of Little Dodder, Dorsetshire carrying a parchment of orders he must deliver with the names of two local mortals and the word "unclay" on it. After losing this important document, he's obliged to stay in Little Dodder until he finds it. Mr. John Death, as the villagers call him, grows interested in human life and decides to take a vacation from his reaping. All the old sins such as lust, avarice, and greed, as well as loving kindness abound in the village.

== Critical reception ==
Kirkus Reviews magazine defined the narrative voice as "satirical but generally gentle, even bumpkin-esque, and sometimes precious" and said it recalled Swift, Twain, Austen, and Jerome K. Jerome, as well as managing to "masterfully cover the spectrum of human failings, from petty to vile, with insight and humor." The Washington Post praised it by saying it was "[Powys's] masterpiece". Jorge Luis Borges described the book as "Heretical, scandalous, and mocking, but essentially parables."
