= Tibor Szász =

Hungarian pianist (1948–2025)

Tibor Szász (9 June 1948 - 22 April 2025) was a Hungarian pianist and author of essays on musicological questions and performance practice related to Liszt, Mozart and Beethoven. Since 1993, Szász was Professor of Piano at the University of Music in Freiburg, Germany.

== Education ==
Tibor Szász was born in 1948 of ethnic Hungarian parents in the city of Cluj, Romania, a Transylvanian university town also known as Kolozsvár (Hungarian) and Klausenburg (German). His piano studies began at the age of four. His official concerto debut came at age 16 with conductor Antonin Ciolan. In 1967, Szász was named Laureate of the George Enescu International Piano Competition held in Bucharest and this honor was followed by many performances with orchestras in Romania. His West German debut came in 1968.

Szász attended the New England Conservatory in Boston, Massachusetts, where he studied with Russell Sherman. After further studies in the United States with Leon Fleisher, Theodore Lettvin, Miklós Schwalb, and Charles Fisher, Tibor Szász distinguished himself as first prize winner of three international piano competitions, including William Kapell International Piano Competition in 1974 (at the time, the competition bore the official name University of Maryland International Piano Competition).

== Artistic career ==
Szász has performed in over one thousand solo, concerto, and chamber music concerts in Romania, Germany, Canada, France, England, Spain, Hungary, Taiwan and the United States of America. Solo recitals in Carnegie Recital Hall and works for piano and orchestra in Boston Symphony Hall, and with the Sinfonia Orchestra of Chicago, led to acclaimed performances of the last three sonatas of Beethoven, first at the "La Gesse Foundation" in France, and then at the Kennedy Center in Washington, D.C. He was featured in two festivals where he performed twenty major works by Beethoven, the last three piano sonatas, the complete violin and cello sonatas, and the first and last piano trio. His chamber music collaborations have included tours with the Takács String Quartet.

All his recordings have been issued in the United States and include works by Beethoven, Chopin, Liszt, Mendelssohn, Schubert and Bartók. Tibor Szász held a Doctor of Musical Arts degree from the University of Michigan, Ann Arbor and was Professor of Piano at Bowling Green State University, the University of Dayton and Duke University. Since 1993 Szász has been Professor of Piano at the Hochschule für Musik Freiburg (University of Music Freiburg, Germany).

== Musicology and essays on performance practice ==
Tibor Szász has written extensively about the music of Liszt, Mozart and Beethoven. His publications include the article Liszt's Symbols for the Divine and Diabolical: Their Revelation of a Program in the B minor Sonata (Journal of the American Liszt Society, June 1984). There are also two articles on Beethoven's piano concertos (the second included in the book Performing Beethoven published in Cambridge Studies in Performance Practice (No.4), by Cambridge University Press, 1994). His most recent contribution published by Early Keyboard Journal centered on a hitherto overlooked authentic source for the Mozart Piano Concerto in C major K. 246 now at the Bibliothèque Nationale de France.
