= Tadnoll and Winfrith Heath =

Nature reserve in Dorset, UK

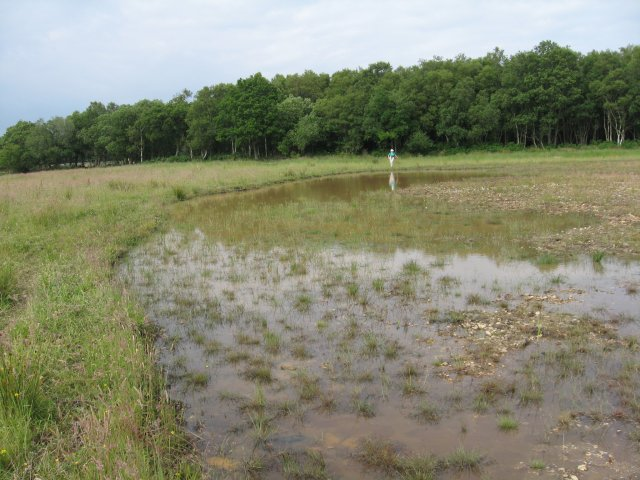
- A scrape for birds in the reserve

- Location within Dorset
- Location: near Winfrith Newburgh
- OS grid: SY 804 863
- Coordinates: 50°40′33″N 2°16′44″W
- Area: 181 hectares (450 acres)
- Operator: Dorset Wildlife Trust
- Website: www.dorsetwildlifetrust.org.uk/nature-reserves/tadnoll-winfrith-heath

Tadnoll and Winfrith Heath is a nature reserve of the Dorset Wildlife Trust, near the village of Winfrith Newburgh in Dorset, England. There is heathland and wetland in the reserve.

Winfrith Heath is designated a Site of Special Scientific Interest. The wetland is designated a Ramsar site, and the reserve has been listed as a Special Area of Conservation.

== Description ==
The total area of the reserve is 181 hectares (450 acres). The chalk stream Tadnoll Brook, a tributary of the River Frome, runs through the site.

The heathland has common heather, bell heather and gorse. Species of birds include nightjar and Dartford warbler, and the silver-studded blue butterfly may be seen.

In the boggy areas of heathland there is sphagnum moss, bog asphodel and sundew. The wetland habitat supports important species of plant and insects including marsh clubmoss and the small red damselfly. In new ponds, colonies of pillwort, a rare aquatic fern, have formed in less than a decade.

== See also ==
- Dorset Heaths
