= Vincent Glinsky =

American sculptor (1895-1975)

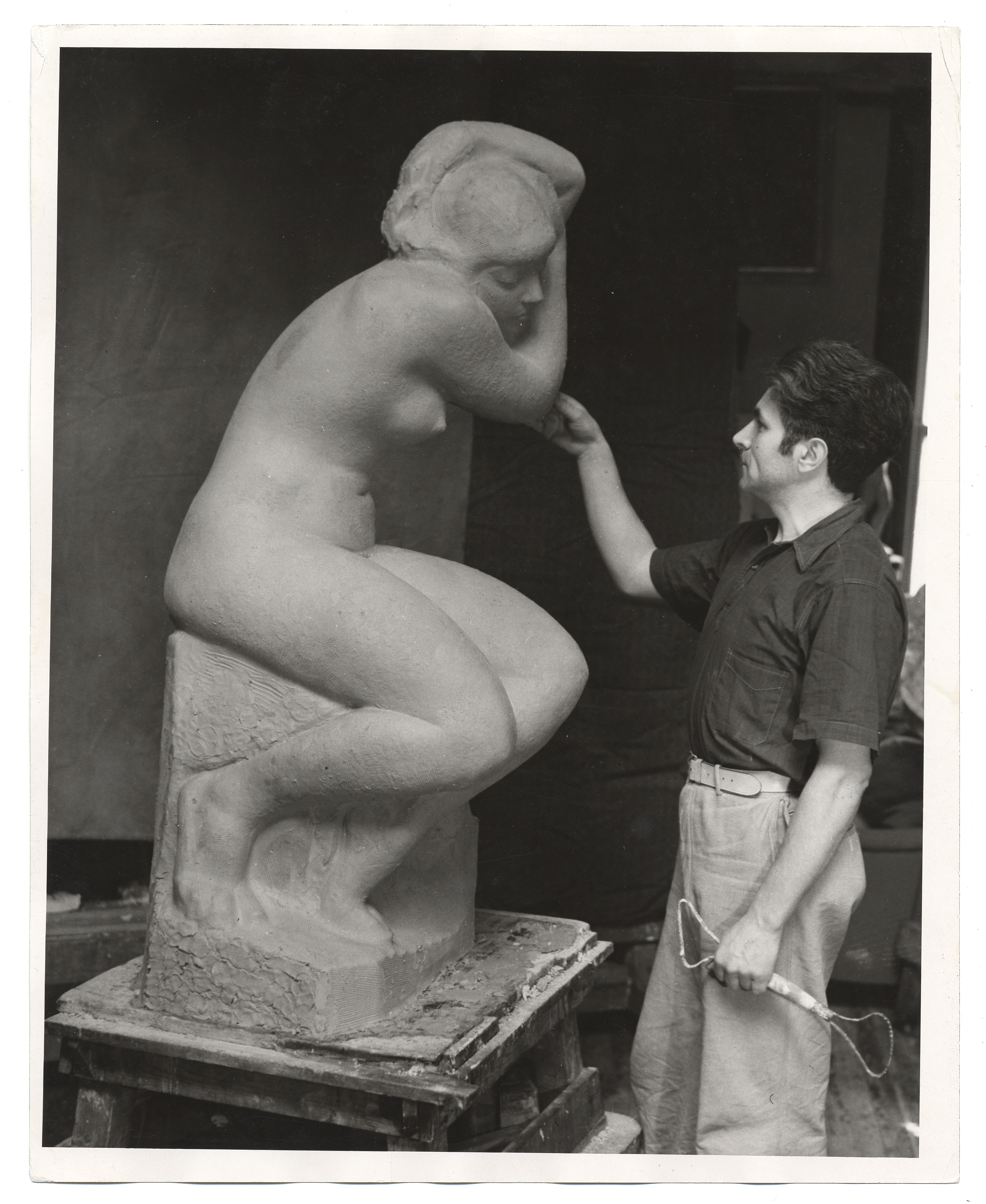
- Vincent Glinsky, from Archives of American Art
- Born: December 18, 1895; Russia
- Died: March 19, 1975 (aged 79); New York City
- Education: Beaux Arts Institute of Design, Columbia University School of Architecture, City College of New York
- Known for: Sculpture

Vincent Glinsky (December 18, 1895 – March 19, 1975) was an American sculptor. He is especially noted for his architectural decorations.

== Life ==
Vincent Glinsky was born in Russia on December 18, 1895 and emigrated to America just before World War I, settling in Syracuse, NY, with his family. In 1916 he moved to New York City, joining the inaugural class of the Beaux Arts Institute of Design, where he later taught (1931–32; 1940–41). During 1925–26 Glinsky studied at Columbia University's School of Architecture and moved into the field of architectural sculpture, working with Albert Kahn ("the architect of Detroit"), on the Maccabees Building, among other projects. Glinsky designed the entranceway reliefs, bronze elevator doors, and letterbox for New York's Fred F. French Building (constructed 1927; added to the National Register of Historic Places, 2004).

In 1927 Glinsky went to live in Europe for approximately two years, settling first in Rome. He later moved to Paris, where he was acknowledged as part of L'Ecole de Paris, a group of artists which included sculptors such as Calder, Giacometti, and Lifschitz, and painters such as Picasso, Dufy, and Roualt. In Paris Glinsky had a one-man show at the Galerie Zak in February 1929, followed by two group shows in Paris, one at Galerie Zak in 1929, and the other at Le Salon des Tuileries in 1930. In 1932 he was part of the Parisian show, "Artistes Americains de Paris," at the Galerie de la Renaissance.

On his return to New York, Glinsky began to exhibit widely. A solo show at The Fifty-Sixth St. Galleries was followed by showings in group exhibitions at The Museum of Modern Art, Brooklyn Museum, Pennsylvania Academy of the Fine Arts, Architectural League, Art Institute of Chicago, National Gallery of Art, and the Whitney Museum of American Art, among other venues. In 1935 he received a Guggenheim Fellowship, and the following year the Pennsylvania Academy of the Fine Arts awarded him the Widener Gold Medal for his work, The Awakening. As a Federal Art Project artist, Glinsky exhibited and presented live sculpture demonstrations at New York's 1939 World's Fair, and won competitive commissions from the Treasury Relief Art Project and the Section of Painting and Sculpture, to create bas-reliefs for United States Post Offices in Hudson, NY, Weirton, WV, and Union City, PA.

In 1937 Glinsky joined with 56 other artists as a Founding Member of the Sculptors Guild in New York. The Sculptors Guild was conceived as an advocacy and exhibiting organization devoted to furthering the sculptural arts. Its 1938 inaugural show included works by Glinsky, Paul Manship, Chaim Gross, Jose de Creeft, Oronzio Maldarelli, William Zorach, and 40 other artists. Glinsky served as Executive Secretary of the Sculptors Guild between 1955–60, and stayed active in the organization until his death. Over the years he took on active roles in other arts organizations, including Vice-President of the Architectural League of New York (1956–58), Fellow of the National Sculpture Society, Academician of the National Academy of Design, and a member of the Audubon Artists' Society.

During World War II Glinsky served as a draftsman at the Brooklyn Navy Yard (1943–46). He won an Arts and Letters Award from the American Academy of Arts and Letters and National Institute of Arts and Letters in 1945, and the Pennsylvania Academy of the Fine Arts awarded him the 1948 Herbert M. Howe Memorial Prize. In 1949 he was one of 250 sculptors who exhibited in the 3rd Sculpture International at the Philadelphia Museum of Art. At the same time Glinsky also began a career in teaching, joining the faculty of Brooklyn College (1949–55), Columbia University (1957–62), and New York University (1950–75).

Later commissions included a series of panels for the National Institutes of Health in Bethesda, MD, (which were posthumously enlarged for display in the lobby of N.I.H.); a bust of aviation pioneer Wilbur Wright for the N.Y.U. Hall of Fame for Great Americans; a bronze head of Eleanor Roosevelt, which became part of the collection at the U.S. Department of Labor; "The Waters of Life" sculpture for All Faiths' Memorial Tower; and an over-life-size piece for St.Paul's College in Washington D.C. His last commission, from the Tupperware Company, was a giant seal in carrara marble. In 1969 he was elected into the National Academy of Design as an Associate member, and became a full Academician in 1970.

Following the artist's death on March 19, 1975, his students initiated the Vincent Glinsky Memorial Lecture, an annual event at NYU. The series ran for 12 years beginning in 1982, and featured noted art historians, critics, and artists. The inaugural lecture was given by Kirk Varnedoe, Curator of the Museum of Modern Art. Other speakers in the series included Hilton Kramer, Richard McDermott Miller, Joseph Veach Noble, Lewis Sharp, Richard Brilliant, Barbara Lekberg, Judd Tully, Marcel Jovine, Greg Wyatt, and Louis Trakis. Glinsky's colleagues also moved to honor his memory: The Sculptors Guild dedicated the 1976 Lever House exhibit to his memory, and the Audubon Artists named a yearly award in his honor.

Vincent Glinsky’s papers are held at Syracuse University and the Smithsonian Institution's Archives of American Art. He was married to the American sculptor Cleo Hartwig (1907–1988). His son is composer and author Albert Glinsky.

=== Bibliography ===
- Images of America; Sculpture of Brookgreen Gardens

Robin R. Salmon Arcadia Publishing, San Francisco, 2009

- Who Was Who in American Art: 1564–1975; 400 Years of Artists in America

Falk, Peter H. Sound View Press, 1999

- Dictionary of American Painters, Sculptors, & Engravers

Fielding, Mantle/Opitz, Glenn B. Apollo, NY, 1986

- A Dual Autobiography

Durant, Will and Ariel Simon and Schuster, NY, 1977

- Index to Artistic Biography, First Supplement

Havlice, Patricia Pate Scarecrow Press, NJ, 1973

- Contemporary American Sculpture

Brumme, C. Ludwig Crown Publishers, New York, 1970

- Contemporary Stone Sculpture

Meilach, Dona Z. Crown Publishers, New York, 1970

- Fifty Contemporary American Artists

Gulack, Herman C. Plantin Press, New York, 1957

- Brookgreen Gardens, Sculpture Vol. II

Proske, Beatrice Gilman Order of the Trustees, Brookgreen, S.C. 1955

- Mallett's Index of Artists; International-Biographical

Daniel Trowbridge Mallett Peter Smith, NY, 1948

- Sculpture in Modern America

Schnier, Jacques University of California Press, 1948
