= Five Marys =

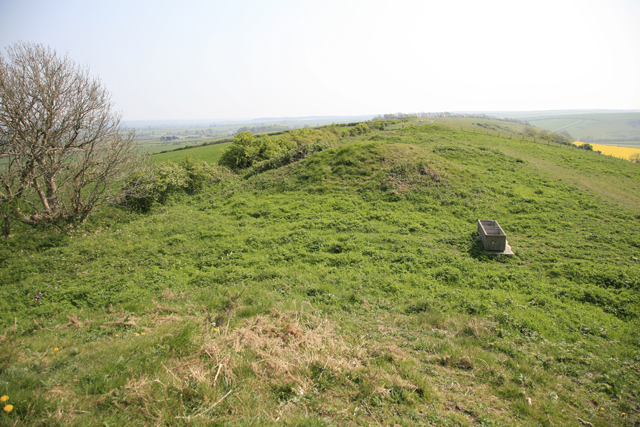
- Looking east along the line of barrows

- Location within Dorset
- 50°39′25.6″N 2°17′53.2″W
- Type: Round barrows
- Periods: Bronze Age
- Location: near Chaldon Herring, Dorset
- OS grid reference: SY 790 842

Site notes
- Excavation dates: 19th century
- Archaeologists: Duchess of Berry

Scheduled monument
- Designated: 27 February 1957
- Reference no.: 1013344

The Five Marys is a group of Bronze Age round barrows near the village of Chaldon Herring, in Dorset, England. The site is a scheduled monument.

== Description ==
The barrows, on a west–east ridge overlooking Chaldon Herring to the south, are in an almost straight line. In Taylor's Map of Dorset, of 1765, they are shown as "Five Meers" (boundary points).

There are two bowl barrows, and four or seven bell barrows, according to different surveys. A pond barrow has been discerned but was not visible on other inspections. The largest barrow has height 3.3 metres (11 ft). All but one have been damaged by antiquarian excavation.

=== Excavation ===
Two of the barrows were excavated before 1866 by the Duchess of Berry; she was staying in Lulworth Castle, in exile after the dethronement of Charles X of France in 1830.

The two barrows excavated are thought to be the first and third large barrows from the west end. A deep chalk-cut grave was found in each barrow, each containing a male skeleton in a sitting position, with stag antlers overlying each shoulder. One barrow also contained a female skeleton, with similarly placed stag antlers, and the other had a secondary cremation in an urn.
