= Chaldon Herring =

Village in Dorset, England

Coordinates: 50.6497°N 2.2969°W

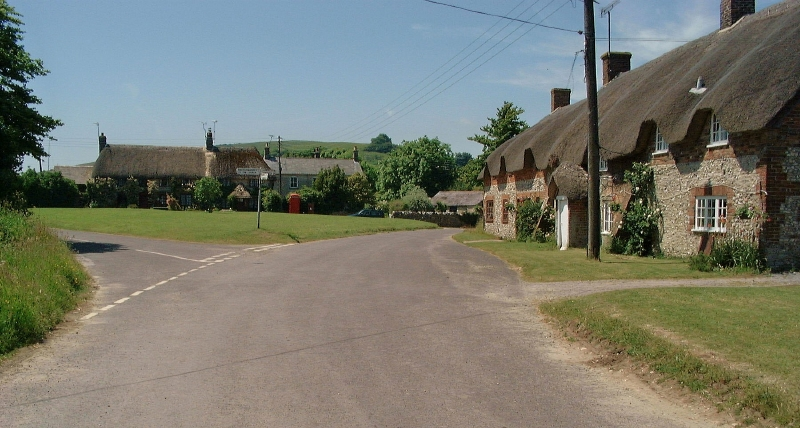
- Chaldon Herring

- Location within Dorset
- Population: 140
- OS grid reference: SY792833
- Civil parish: Chaldon Herring
- Unitary authority: Dorset
- Ceremonial county: Dorset
- Region: South West
- Country: England
- Sovereign state: United Kingdom
- Post town: Dorchester
- Postcode district: DT2
- Police: Dorset
- Fire: Dorset and Wiltshire
- Ambulance: South Western
- UK Parliament: South Dorset

Chaldon Herring or East Chaldon is a village and civil parish in the English county of Dorset, about 8 miles (13 km) south-east of the county town of Dorchester. It is sited 2 miles (3.2 km) from the coast in the chalk hills of the South Dorset Downs. The highest point in the area is Chaldon Hill about 1.5 miles (2.4 km) to the south, overlooking the sea. In the 2011 census the civil parish had 59 households and a population of 140.

In 1086 in the Domesday Book, Chaldon Herring was recorded as Calvedone and, together with West Chaldon, appears in three entries.

The Herring family were landowners for a long period (as early as 1166 until at least 1372), so the village and parish appended their family name to the placename. Elizabeth Herring, daughter of John Herring of Chaldon Herring, was the great-grandmother of John Russell, 1st Earl of Bedford; the Herringham arms are displayed in the second grand quarter of Bedford's coat of arms.

Chaldon Herring is notable for being the home of Llewelyn Powys and his wife, Alyse Gregory. In 1925 the couple moved to Dorset: firstly to the Coastguard Cottages on White Nothe and then to the nearby farmhouse Chydyok, where his two sisters, the poet and novelist, Philippa Powys, and the artist, Gertrude Powys, occupied the adjacent cottage. Various other writers and artists lived in the village at different times. These include the sisters Elizabeth Muntz, a sculptor and author, and Hope Muntz, a historian, who wrote The Golden Warrior; novelists Sylvia Townsend Warner and David Garnett; the poets Valentine Ackland and Gamel Woolsey; and the sculptor Stephen Tomlin.

The novelist Theodore "T. F." Powys, older brother of Llewelyn, lived in Chaldon from 1904 until 1940, when he moved to Mappowder because of the war. Chaldon Herring was the inspiration for the fictitious village of Folly Down in his novel Mr Weston's Good Wine and other works. It was at Theodore Powys's house that novelist Sylvia Townsend Warner first met the poet Valentine Ackland. Warner's diaries record that the two women lived together in Frome Vauchurch from 1930 until Valentine's death in 1969; she died there on 1 May 1978.

Just north of the village are four prehistoric bowl barrows. The Five Marys, a group of round barrows, are on a ridge farther north with two more bowl barrows. These are all scheduled monuments.

The parish church is St. Nicholas. There is a restaurant-pub, The Sailor's Return, and B. & B. accommodation. The newest shop is in Winfrith Newburgh, a mile away. The village has 18 listed buildings, all at Grade II.
