= Charles Augustin Sainte-Beuve =

French literary critic (1804–1869)

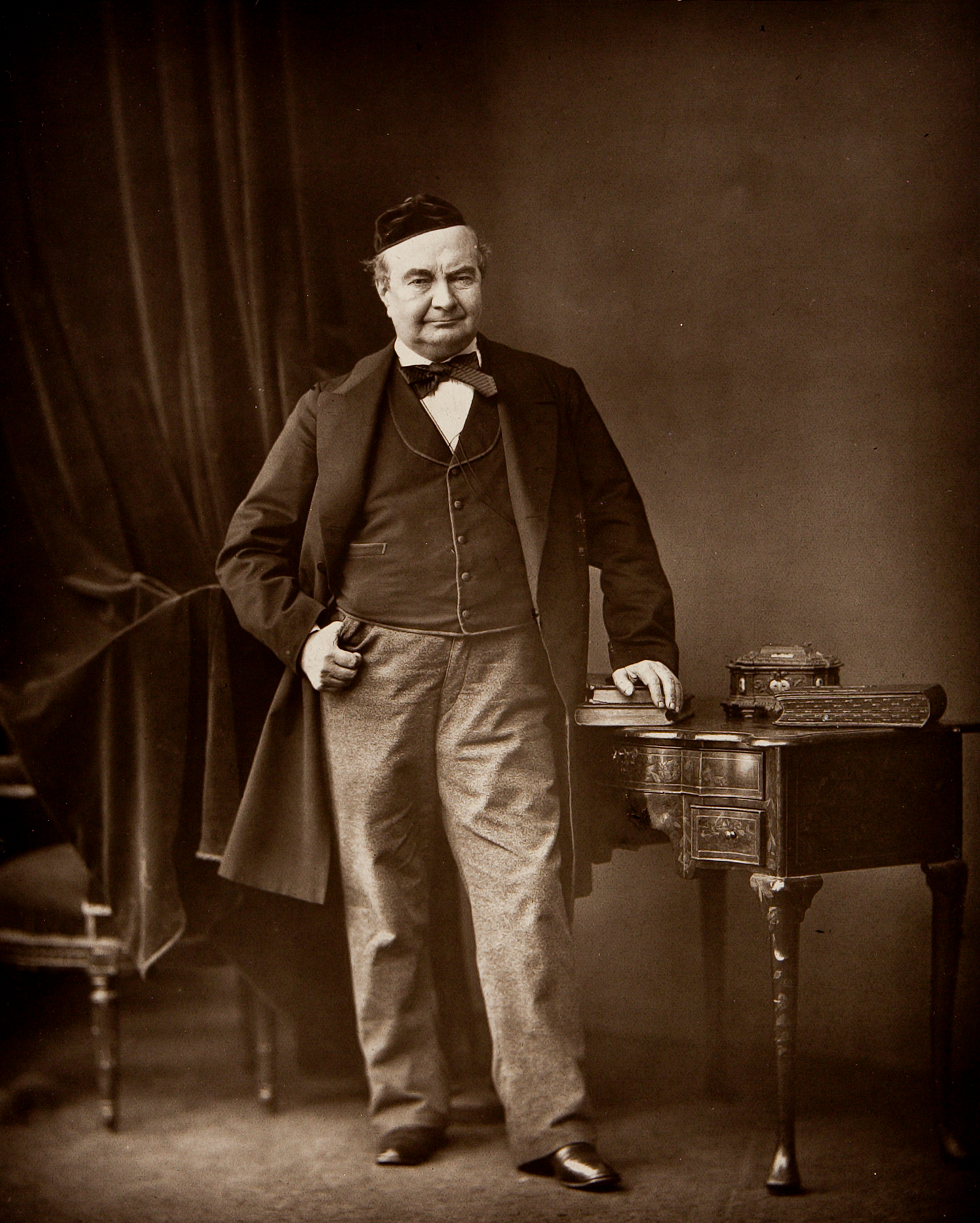
- Sainte-Beuve, c. 1860s
- Born: 23 December 1804; Boulogne-sur-Mer, Picardy, First French Empire
- Died: 13 October 1869 (aged 64); Paris, Second French Empire
- Education: Collège Charlemagne
- Occupation: Literary critic
- Writing career
- Language: French
- Notable work: Port-Royal

Charles Augustin Sainte-Beuve (French: [ʃaʁl oɡystɛ̃ sɛ̃t bœv]; 23 December 1804 – 13 October 1869) was a French literary critic.

== Early life ==
He was born in Boulogne, educated there, and studied medicine at the Collège Charlemagne in Paris (1824–27). In 1828, he served in the St Louis Hospital. Beginning in 1824, he contributed literary articles, the Premier lundis of his collected Works, to the newspaper Globe, and in 1827 he came, by a review of Victor Hugo's Odes et Ballades, into close association with Hugo and the Cénacle, the literary circle that strove to define the ideas of the rising Romanticism and struggle against classical formalism. Sainte-Beuve became friendly with Hugo after publishing a favourable review of the author's work but later had an affair with Hugo's wife, Adèle Foucher, which resulted in their estrangement. Curiously, when Sainte-Beuve was made a member of the French Academy in 1845, the ceremonial duty of giving the reception speech fell upon Hugo.

== Career ==
Sainte-Beuve published collections of poems and the partly autobiographical novel Volupté in 1834. His articles and essays were collected the volumes Port-Royal and Portraits littéraires.

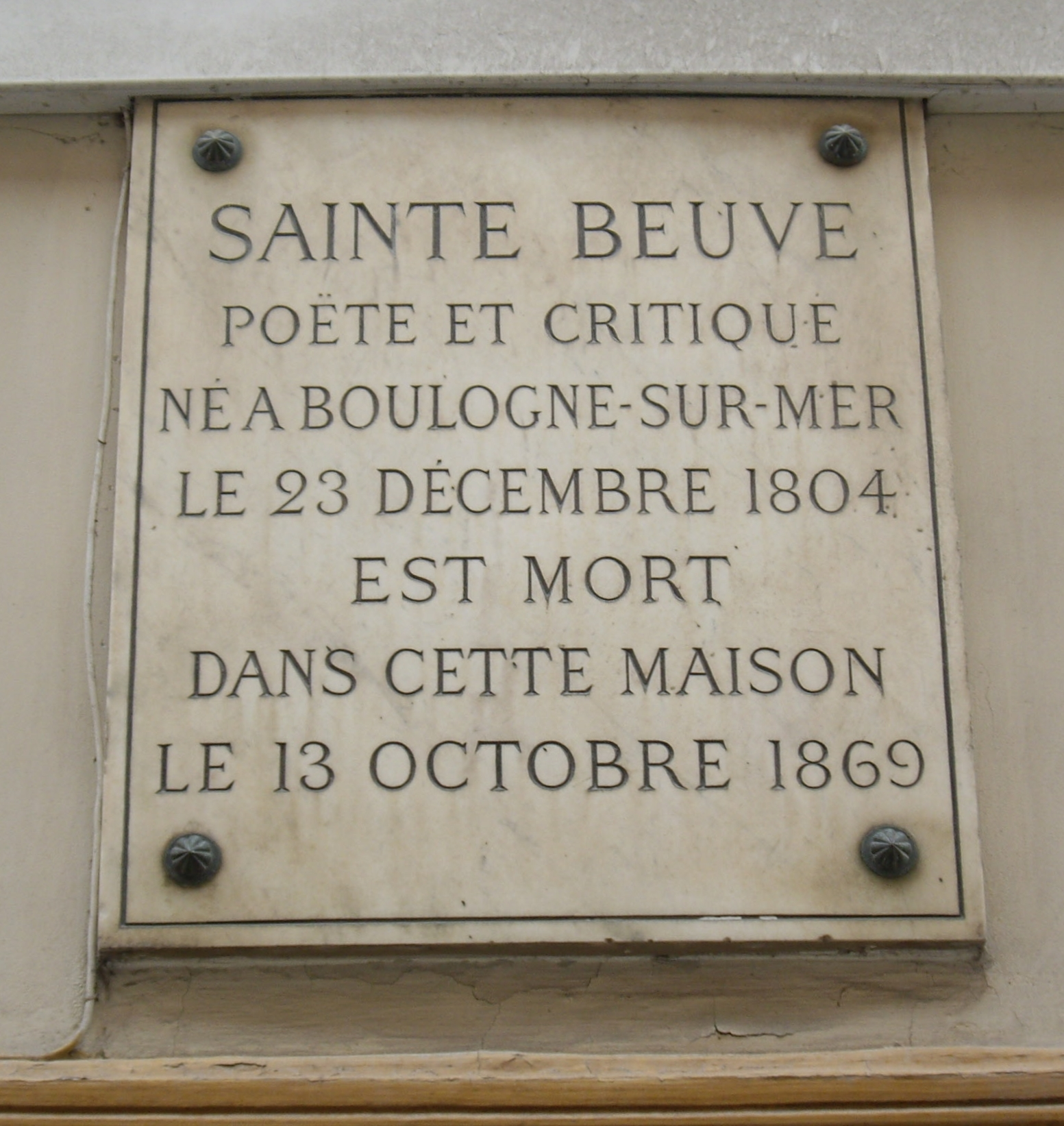
Commemorative plaque, 11 Rue du Montparnasse, Paris

During the rebellions of 1848 in Europe, he lectured at Liège on Chateaubriand and his literary circle. He returned to Paris in 1849 and began his series of topical columns, Causeries du lundi ('Monday Chats') in the newspaper, Le Constitutionnel. When Louis Napoleon became Emperor, he made Sainte-Beuve professor of Latin poetry at the Collège de France, but anti-Imperialist students hissed him, and he resigned.

=== Port-Royal ===
After several books of poetry and a couple of failed novels, Sainte-Beuve began to do literary research, of which the most important publication resulting is Port-Royal. He continued to contribute to La Revue contemporaine.

Port-Royal (1837–1859), probably Sainte-Beuve's masterpiece, is an exhaustive history of the Jansenist abbey of Port-Royal-des-Champs, near Paris. It not only influenced the historiography of religious belief, i.e., the method of such research, but also the philosophy of history and the history of esthetics.

He was made Senator in 1865, in which capacity he distinguished himself by his pleas for freedom of speech and of the press. According to Jules Amédée Barbey d'Aurevilly, "Sainte-Beuve was a clever man with the temper of a turkey!" In his last years, he was an acute sufferer and lived much in retirement.

One of Sainte-Beuve's critical contentions was that, in order to understand an artist and his work, it was necessary to understand that artist's biography. Marcel Proust took issue with this notion and repudiated it in a set of essays, Contre Sainte-Beuve ("Against Sainte-Beuve"). Proust developed the ideas first voiced in those essays in À la recherche du temps perdu (In Search of Lost Time). In his preface to Paul Morand's Tendres Stocks, Proust attacks Sainte-Beuve, especially for his reception of Charles Baudelaire and behaviour towards the latter.

== Reception ==
In 1880 Friedrich Nietzsche, though an avowed opponent of Sainte-Beuve, prompted the wife of his friend Franz Overbeck, Ida Overbeck, to translate the Causeries du lundi into German. Until then, Sainte-Beuve was never published in German despite his great importance in France, since it was considered representative of a French way of thinking detested in Germany. Ida Overbeck's translation appeared in 1880 under the title Die Menschen des XVIII. Jahrhunderts (Men of the 18th Century). Nietzsche wrote to Ida Overbeck on August 18, 1880: "An hour ago I received the Die Menschen des XVIII. Jahrhunderts, [...] It is just a marvellous book. I think I've cried." Ida Overbeck's translation is an important document of the cultural transfer between Germany and France in a period of strong tension, but it was largely ignored. It was not until 2014 that a critical and annotated edition of this translation appeared in print.

Sainte-Beuve died in Paris, aged 64.

== Publications ==
=== Non-fiction ===
- Tableau Historique et Critique de la Poésie Française et du Théâtre Français au XVIe Siècle (2 vols., 1828).
- Port-Royal (5 vols., 1840–1859).
- Portraits Littéraires (3 vols., 1844; 1876–78).
- Portraits Contemporains (5 vols., 1846; 1869–71).
- Portraits de Femmes (1844; 1870).
- Causeries du Lundi (16 vols., 1851–1881).
- Nouveaux Lundis (13 vols., 1863–1870).
- Premiers Lundis (3 vols., 1874–75).
- Étude sur Virgile (1857).
- Chateaubriand et son Groupe Littéraire (2 vols., 1860).
- Le Général Jomini (1869).
- Madame Desbordes-Valmore (1870).
- M. de Talleyrand (1870).
- P.-J. Proudhon (1872).
- Chroniques Parisiennes (1843–1845 & 1876).
- Les Cahiers de Sainte-Beuve (1876).
- Mes Poisons (1926).

=== Novels ===
- Volupté (1834).
- Madame de Pontivy (1839).
- Christel (1839).
- La Pendule (1880).

=== Short stories ===
- Le Clou d’or dedicated to Sophie de Bazancourt, woman of letters and wife of général François Aimé Frédéric Loyré d'Arbouville.
- De la littérature industrielle, Paris, Allia, 2013, 48p. ISBN 9782844857309
- Portrait de Leopardi (Paris, Allia, 2019, 2nd edition, 80p) ISBN 9791030411591

=== Poetry ===
- Vie, Poésies et Pensées de Joseph Delorme (1829).
- Les Consolations (1830).
- Pensées d'août (1837).
- Livre d'Amour (1843).
- Poésies Complètes (1863).
- Poésies françaises d'une Italienne (1854) by Agathe-Sophie Sasserno, preface by Sainte-Beuve

=== In English translation ===
- Portraits of Celebrated Women (1868, trans. Harriet W. Preston).
- Memoirs of Madame Desbordes-Valmore (1873, trans. Harriet W. Preston).
- English Portraits (1875, a selection from Causeries du Lundi).
- Monday-chats (1877, trans. William Matthews)
- Essays on Men and Women (1890, trans. William Matthews and Harriet W. Preston).
- Essays (1890, trans. Elizabeth Lee).
- Portraits of Men (1891, trans. Forsyth Edeveain).
- Portraits of Women (1891, trans. Helen Stott).
- Select Essays of Sainte-Beuve (1895, trans. Arthur John Butler).
- The Prince de Ligne (1899, trans. Katharine Prescott Wormeley).
- The Correspondence of Madame, Princess Palatine (1899, trans. Katharine Prescott Wormeley).
- Memoirs and Letters of Cardinal de Bernis (1902, trans. Katharine Prescott Wormeley).
- Portraits of the Seventeenth Century: Historic and Literary (1904, trans. Katharine Prescott Wormeley).
- Portraits of the Eighteenth Century: Historic and Literary (1905, trans. Katharine Prescott Wormeley).
- The Essays of Sainte-Beuve (1901, ed. William Sharp).
- Causeries du lundi (1909–11, 8 vols., trans. E.J. Trechmann).
- Selected Essays (1963, trans. & ed. Francis Steegmuller and Norbert Guterman).
- Volupté: The Sensual Man (1995, trans. Marilyn Gaddis Rose).
