= William Warner (cricketer) =

Welsh-born English cricketer

Personal information
- Full name: William Sydney Oke Warner
- Born: 29 August 1844; Swansea, Glamorgan, Wales
- Died: 22 October 1871 (aged 27); Laverstock, Wiltshire, England
- Batting: Right-handed
- Relatives: Townsend Warner (brother)

Domestic team information
- Years: Team
- 1865–1868: Cambridge University

Career statistics
Competition	First-class
Matches	13
Runs scored	323
Batting average	16.15
100s/50s	–/1
Top score	50
Catches/stumpings	7/–
- Source: Cricinfo, 25 January 2023

William Sidney Oke Warner (29 August 1844 – 22 October 1871) was a Welsh-born English cricketer who played in 13 first-class cricket matches for Cambridge University between 1865 and 1868. He was born at Swansea, Glamorgan and died at Salisbury, Wiltshire.

Warner was educated at home in Devon by his clergyman father and then at Trinity College, Cambridge. He had played a lot of cricket for the Gentlemen of Devon team as a right-handed middle-order batsman, but failed to make much impression on Cambridge cricket in either 1865 or 1866. In 1867, however, he scored 43 in his first match against the Marylebone Cricket Club (MCC). He then retained his place in the first eleven all the way through to the University Match against Oxford University when, top-scoring for his side in each innings with 27 and 34 not out, he played a big part in a Cambridge victory. He played again regularly in 1868 and made his highest first-class score, 50, in the match against Surrey. His final first-class match was the 1868 University Match, though his contribution to another Cambridge victory was limited.

Warner graduated from Cambridge University with a Bachelor of Arts degree in 1868. He was ordained as a Church of England deacon in 1870 and served as curate at Shalfleet on the Isle of Wight from that year. After a year, however, he died, aged 27.

Warner's older brother The Reverend George Townsend Warner (1841-1902) was a much less successful cricketer at Cambridge. He was also the great-uncle of Sylvia Townsend Warner (1893-1978), the English novelist, poet and musicologist.
