= Allan Turpin =

English novelist and playwright (1903–1979)

Allan Richard Turpin
- Born: 6 February 1903; East Finchley, London, England
- Died: 25 August 1979 (aged 76); Salisbury, England
- Occupation: Writer
- Spouse: Valentine Ackland (annulled)
- Parent(s): Frank Bertie Turpin, Clara Gertrude Gillard

Allan Richard Turpin (6 February 1903 – 25 August 1979) was an English novelist and playwright.

== Early life and education ==
Turpin was the second son of stamp dealer Frank Bertie Turpin and Clara Gertrude Gillard. Turpin and his brother worked for their father, and took over the business when he retired in 1930.

Turpin attended the City of London School where, he later wrote, he "passively resisted education."

== Career ==
In 1920, he took a job as a tour guide in France, where he lived for a year, an experience that was the basis of his first novel Doggett's Tours, which he published in 1932 under the name of Richard Turpin. He then returned to England and went to work for his father.

Turpin's first novel Doggett's Tours was a comic, lightly fictionalized account of his experiences leading groups of English tourists through France, Switzerland, and Italy. James Agate called it "extremely well done, and I congratulate Mr. Turpin on a delicious, non-highbrow sense of humour." It was over 30 years before Turpin published another novel.

Turpin was an avid theatre-goer. He later incorporated his early experiences of London theatre into his 1965 novel The Box. His own efforts at playwrighting, however, achieved only mixed success. His first play, a comedy titled "Fare Includes Romance" played briefly in October 1933. Soon after the end of World War II, he wrote two stage adaptations of novellas by Henry James: The Turn of the Screw and The Aspern Papers. Turpin's prose style would be heavily influenced by James. He also wrote an adaptation of Charles Dickens' novel Nicholas Nickleby. His last play Desire Shall Fall was produced a number of times in the early 1950s but never made it to the West End.

In the early 1960s, he took up fiction again. He published My Flat and Her Apartment in 1964. The novel was an account of an affair between a self-centered Englishman with literary tastes and an equally self-centred American girl and was set in London, Paris, and New York. It was the first of a series of novels he would later call Memoirs of a Naïve Young Man, in which Turpin's fictional alter ego was called Geoffrey Gillard. The book received mildly positive reviews. Siriol Hugh-Jones called it "a perceptive, disturbing and funny tragi-farce."

He followed the next year with The Box, about a young man's love of the theatre and his chaste worship of a married woman. Its reviews established a pattern that would often be repeated in assessments of Turpin's work: praise for his comic voice, mild criticism of his somewhat dated style and subject matter. Andrew Leslie found that, "The story reaches anticlimax too quickly but, as compensation, it is full of felicities of observations, often funny, always interesting, never patronising." An American reviewer, Thomas B. Sherman, wrote that "Turpin's style is off-hand and gossipy. He frequently takes the reader into his confidence and in each instance he seems to be saying: 'Let's not get too serious.'"

Beatrice and Bertha, which Turpin characterized as a "novel-memoir" and formed part of his Memoirs series, and Ladies: An Episode of Revolution appeared in 1966. Isabel Quigly singled out what she called Turpin's "Forsterish" qualities: "Discretion, exactness, a fine ear for the cadences of this or that class's speech, above all a sense of what you might call implication -- suggesting much more than is actually put down, a sort of compression and reticence that are very effective."

Innocent Employments, another instalment in the Memoirs, was published in 1967. It recounted Turpin's father's rise as a stamp dealer and his own early days in the trade. The Laughing Cavalier (1969) was subtitled A Memoir, A Novel and an Epilogue and recalled Turpin's parents and his father's second marriage after his mother's death. Robert Baldick praised Turpin's subtle approach: "If Mr. Turpin cultivates a small plot of literary earth, he tends it with exquisite skill, and the results are never disappointing.... Few authors have written so perceptively about the father-son relationship: it is high time Mr. Turpin's quiet talent was more widely recognized." Claire Tomalin judged that "With fewer ponderous generalisations and more laughter this would have been an even better book: as it is, it deserves a place in the rich chronicles of the English petty bourgeoisie of our century."

There followed a break of some years, after which three further novels, none part of the Memoirs series, appeared. Behind the Net Curtains (1976) and The Little Medicine Bottle (1977) were more darkly comic in tone. Victoria Glendinning wrote of the two books, "Sexual passion is the theme, but so overlaid is it by conventions, reasonable behavior, ironing-boards and cups of tea, that violence and crudeness when they do surface have twice their normal impact." She called Behind the Net Curtains "a classic of its kind" but felt The Little Medicine Bottle was "not quite in the same class." His final novel was The Old Man's Darling, about a May–December marriage. Reviewer Dick McLinden found the story's outcome predictable but wrote that Turpin "has such an engaging way of dealing with the obvious that one simply enjoys being a bystander to this strange marital arrangement."

== Personal life ==
In 1925, Turpin met and fell in love with Mary Kathleen Macrory Ackland, daughter of a London dentist. The two were quite inexperienced in both romantic and sexual love and decided impulsively to get married. As Ackland, who went on to adopt the name Valentine and become the life-long companion of the writer Sylvia Townsend Warner, later wrote, "I rang up Richard and asked him to meet me for lunch. We went to a restaurant in the Strand and I said 'I will marry you if you will marry me tomorrow. I won't if it is put off for a day.'" Ackland was already finding herself attracted to women and the marriage was further complicated by her pain in attempting intercourse and his own homosexual tendencies. She recalled that "Richard was without any experience of women, and he was suffering from remorse and fear because of certain homosexual relationships he had enjoyed recently." The couple rarely lived together and the marriage was annulled in October 1927.

Turpin remained single for the rest of his life, often sharing a house or flat with a married couple. In 1939, he invited the writer Desmond Hawkins to share his house in Saffron Walden, Essex and the two men would read out from their novels-in-progress each evening. Hawkins' novel was later published as Lighter than Day (1940); Turpin abandoned his book.

In the early 1950s, Turpin lived briefly in New York City but returned to England. He died alone in his house in Salisbury, Wiltshire, in August 1979; his body was found the next day. He left his entire estate to the Royal Literary Fund.

== Works ==
Plays

- Fare Includes Romance (1933)
- The Turn of the Screw (1946)
- Nicholas Nickleby (1946)
- The Aspern Papers (1947)
- Desire Shall Fall (1949)

Novels

- Doggett's Tours (as Richard Turpin) (1932)
- My Flat and Her Apartment (1964)
- The Box: A Conversation Piece (1965)
- Beatrice and Bertha: A Novel-Memoir (1966)
- Ladies: An Episode of Revolution (1966)
- Indecent Employments (1967)
- The Laughing Cavalier (1969)
- Behind the Curtains (1976)
- The Little Medicine Bottle (1977)
- The Old Man's Darling (1977)
