= Summer Will Show =

1936 novel

- Author: Sylvia Townsend Warner
- Genre: historical fiction, lesbian literature
- Publication date: 1936

Summer Will Show is a 1936 novel by Sylvia Townsend Warner. The novel follows a wealthy English noblewoman who falls in love with a female Jewish revolutionary and becomes involved in the French Revolution of 1848.

== Background and publication history ==
Summer Will Show was the fourth novel published by English writer Sylvia Townsend Warner. She began writing the novel in 1932. In 1935, the year prior to the publication of Summer Will Show, Warner and her partner, Valentine Ackland, joined the Communist Party of Great Britain. This may have influenced the political content of the novel.

In th 1960s, Warner wrote that she conceived of the character Sophia Willoughby while working on the collection Tudor Church Music.

It must have been in 1920 or 21...that I said to a young man called Robert Firebrace that I had invented a person: an early Victorian young lady of means with a secret passion for pugilism; she attended prize-fights dressed as a man and kept a punching-ball under lock and key in her dressing-room. He asked what she looked like and I replied without hesitation: Smooth fair hair, tall, reserved, very lady like. She's called Sophia Willoughby. And there she was and there she stayed. I had no thought of doing anything with her. A year or so later out of the blue I saw Minna telling about the pogrom in a Paris drawing-room and Lamartine leaning against the doorway.

— Sylvia Townsend Warner, A note on Summer Will Show, Letters of Sylvia Townsend Warner

== Plot summary ==
The novel follows Sophia Willoughby, a wealthy English woman who lives with her two children on Blandamer, the country estate she inherited from her father. She is estranged from her husband, Frederick, who lives in Paris, and runs the estate by herself. Caspar, the biracial illegitimate son of Sophia's uncle, has come to England from the West Indies. Sophia briefly hosts him at Blandamer before sending him to boarding school.

After her children fall ill and die, Sophia travels to Paris in hopes of reuniting with Frederick and bearing another child. In Paris, she meets and falls in love with Frederick's mistress, Minna Lemuel, a Lithuanian Jewish woman who lives a bohemian lifestyle and is renowned for her oratory talents. Sophia and Minna grow closer, with Sophia eventually moving out of her Aunt Léocadie's home and into Minna's apartment. Through Minna, Sophia becomes increasingly involved in revolutionary circles and activities.

Though a reconciliation between Sophia and Frederick had initially seemed likely, their relationship is severed completely due to Sophia's romance with Minna. As Sophia's legal husband, Frederick takes possession of her money and property, leaving Sophia and Minna in poverty. Meanwhile, Caspar arrives in Paris, having run away from boarding school. Initially, he had returned to Blandamer, but discovered that it had been boarded on orders from Frederick. Sophia asks Frederick to send Caspar to a school in Paris that she has selected for him, but later learns that Frederick has enlisted Caspar in the military.

Eventually, the unrest in Paris culminates in the French Revolution of 1848, with violence breaking out between the revolutionaries and the military. While helping to defend a barricade, Minna is stabbed by Caspar, who is then shot by Sophia. Sophia is captured and taken to be executed by firing squad, but is not killed due to her status as a 'lady'.

Sophia is told that Minna and Caspar are both likely dead, but she is unable to confirm this. Aunt Léocadie offers Sophia the chance to return to her former life, but Sophia declines. The novel ends with Sophia beginning to read a pamphlet circulating among the revolutionaries in Paris, which turns out to be Marx and Engels's Communist Manifesto.

== Reception ==
Summer Will Show has been an object of study for scholars including Thomas C. Foster and Heather K. Love.
