= Townsend Warner =

English clergyman, schoolmaster, and cricketer

Personal information
- Full name: George Townsend Warner
- Born: 9 May 1841; Southampton, Hampshire, England
- Died: 22 November 1902 (aged 61); Torquay, Devon, England
- Batting: Unknown
- Bowling: Unknown-arm underarm
- Relatives: William Warner (brother)

Domestic team information
- Years: Team
- 1862: Cambridge University
- 1863: Marylebone Cricket Club

Career statistics
Competition	First-class
Matches	3
Runs scored	31
Batting average	7.75
100s/50s	–/–
Top score	21
Catches/stumpings	3/–
- Source: Cricinfo, 25 January 2023

The Reverend George Townsend Warner (9 May 1841 – 22 November 1902) was an English clergyman and schoolmaster and a cricketer who played in three first-class cricket matches between 1860 and 1863. He was born at Southampton in Hampshire and died at Torquay in Devon.

Warner's son also called George Townsend Warner (1865-1916) was a house-master at Harrow School and was, for many years, associated with the prestigious Harrow History Prize which was renamed the Townsend Warner History Prize following his death in 1916. His granddaughter was the English poet, writer, and journalist, Sylvia Townsend Warner (1893-1978) who was an English novelist, poet and musicologist.

Warner was educated at Harrow School and at Trinity College, Cambridge. As a cricketer, he played as an opening batsman in two matches against Cambridge University: one for the Cambridge Town Club in 1860 and the other for the Marylebone Cricket Club (MCC) in 1863. Though he played in trial matches and lesser games for Cambridge University, his only first-class match for the university's first team saw him bat in the lower order and he was not successful. It is not known if he batted right-handed, or left-handed.

Warner graduated from Cambridge University with a Bachelor of Arts degree in 1864, and this was converted to a Master of Arts in 1868. He was ordained as a Church of England deacon in 1864 and as a priest two years later and served as curate at parishes in Devon until 1875.

In 1875, Warner became headmaster of the Newton Abbot Proprietary college; one of his pupils there was the writer Arthur Quiller-Couch who wrote of him:

A tall sanguine man, in the middle years, but athletic yet, a rare runner between wickets; in school, and out of it, an organiser: a gentleman with every attribute of a good Head Master save a sense of justice, of which he had scarcely a glimmer, and being choleric, could be angriest when most unjust.

Warner also taught Bertram Fletcher Robinson and Percy Fawcett who later befriended and influenced the author, Arthur Conan Doyle.

From 1895 to his death in 1902 he returned to church work as rector of Alfold, Surrey.

Warner's younger brother William was a much more successful cricketer at Cambridge University.
