= Douwe Eisenga =

Dutch composer

Douwe Eisenga (born 1961, in Apeldoorn) is a Dutch composer. His most known work is Requiem Aeternam 1953, composed on an occasion of the 50th North Sea flood of 1953 anniversary.

Eisenga is a self-taught musician and has begun composing music for theatre and films in 1980s. From 1990 to 1996, he studied composition with Julius Ament and Wim Dirriwachter at Prince Claus Conservatoire in Groningen.

In the last years, he composed various works for musical ensembles as Xenakis Ensemble, Francis B. Quartet or the pianists Gerard Bouwhuis and Marcel Worms. In 1999, his CD Rivius II recorded by pianist Rien Balkenende was published. Then, in 2001, his piece Growing worm, stabbing his back-part slowly into the blues was published on his CD More new blues for piano. In the same years Eisenga appeared in Vlissingen to make premiere performance of Kabaal (Kabbalah), his chamber music piece about Michiel de Ruyter, at the Zeeland Nazomer Festival (Zeeland Autumn Festival).

In 2003, his work Requiem Aeternam 1953, a composition for choir and orchestra, was premiered at the occasion of the 50th anniversary of the North Sea flood of 1953. In 2004, a large part of his works was premiered at a concert in the Center for New Music in Zeeland.

In 2017 he released his the piano composition For Mattia, which he wrote at the request of two parents in memory of their deceased daughter. It has been on the yearly broadcast Dutch Classical Top 400 list continuously since 2017.

Eisenga's work has roots in pop music of his generation. He makes no difference between pop songs, twelve-tone techniques, baroque music or eastern musical patterns and manages to combine these elements in his compositions.

From 1993, Eisenga lives in Zeeland.
