= Valentine Ackland =

English poet (1906–1969)

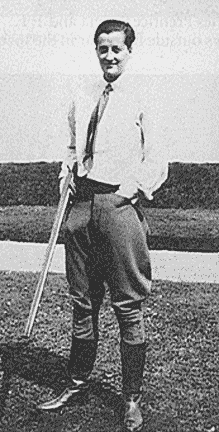
- Ackland in 1930
- Born: Mary Kathleen Macrory Ackland; 20 May 1906; 54 Brook Street, London, England
- Died: 9 November 1969 (aged 63); Maiden Newton, Dorset, England
- Resting place: St. Nicholas Churchyard, Chaldon Herring, Dorset, England
- Occupation: Poet
- Political party: Communist Party; Liberal Party
- Spouse: Richard Turpin (annulled)
- Partner: Sylvia Townsend Warner (1931–1969)

Valentine Ackland (born Mary Kathleen Macrory Ackland; 20 May 1906 – 9 November 1969) was an English poet, and life partner of novelist Sylvia Townsend Warner. Their relationship was strained by Ackland’s infidelities and alcoholism, but survived for nearly forty years. Both were closely involved with communism, remaining under continued scrutiny by the authorities. Ackland’s poetry did not become widely noticed until after her death, when her reflective, confessional style was more in vogue, and left-wing writers of the 1930s had become a popular topic.

== Life ==
Mary Kathleen Macrory "Molly" Ackland was born 20 May 1906 at 54 Brook Street, London to Robert Craig Ackland and Ruth Kathleen (née Macrory). Nicknamed "Molly" by her family, she was the younger of two sisters. With no sons born to the family, her father, a West End London dentist, worked at making a symbolic son of Molly, teaching her to shoot rifles and to box. The attention to Molly made her elder sister, Joan Alice Elizabeth (born 1898), immensely jealous. Older by eight years, Joan reportedly psychologically tormented and physically abused Molly.

Molly received an Anglican upbringing in Norfolk and a convent school education in London. In 1925, at the age of 19, she impetuously married Richard Turpin, a homosexual youth who was unable to consummate their marriage. Upon her marriage, she was also received into the Roman Catholic Church, a religion that she later abandoned, returned to, and then abandoned again in the last decade of her life. The consummation was difficult and she had to undergo an operation to stretch her hymen. In less than a year, she had her marriage to Turpin annulled on the grounds that she was a virgin. The doctor who performed the examination failed to spot that she was pregnant due to an affair. Her husband had agreed to adopt the child but she had a miscarriage and she was determined to end the marriage. She began wearing men's clothing, cut her hair in a short style called the Eton crop, and was at times mistaken for a handsome young boy. She changed her name to the androgynous Valentine Ackland in the late 1920s when she decided to become a serious poet. Her poetry appeared in British and American literary journals during the 1920s to the 1940s, but Ackland deeply regretted that she never became a more widely read poet. Indeed, much of her poetry was published posthumously, and she received little attention from critics until a revival of interest in her work in the 1970s.

In 1930, Ackland was introduced to the short story writer and novelist Sylvia Townsend Warner, with whom she would maintain a lifelong (39 years) relationship, albeit tumultuous at times given Ackland's infidelities and increasing alcoholism. In 1950 and 1951 they rented Great Eye Folly at Salthouse, where Warner wrote her final novel, The Flint Anchor (published 1954). Warner was twelve years older than Ackland, and the two lived together until Ackland's death from breast cancer in 1969. Warner outlived Ackland by nine years, dying in 1978. Ackland's reflections upon her relationship with Warner and with American heiress and writer Elizabeth Wade White (1908–1994), were posthumously published in For Sylvia: An Honest Account (1985).

Ackland was responsible for involving Warner in the Communist Party, which both joined in 1934. They were taken up with the party's participation in the II International Congress of Writers for the Defense of Culture, held in Valencia between 4 and 17 July 1937, within the framework of the Spanish Civil War as well as numerous socialist and pacifist activities. The two women's involvement in the Communist Party came under investigation by the British government in the late 1930s and remained an open file until 1957, when the investigation was halted. Ackland and Warner supported the Republican cause during the Spanish Civil War, and Ackland criticised the British government for its indifference to the "sufferings of the Spanish people at the grass-roots level" in her poem "Instructions from England, 1936".

Note nothing of why or how, enquire
no deeper than you need
into what set these veins on fire,
Note simply that they bleed.

After World War II, Ackland turned her attention to confessional poetry and a memoir concerning her relationship with Warner and its many emotional issues as Ackland pursued involvements with other women. At first, Warner was tolerant of her younger lover's dalliances, but the seriousness and length of Ackland's relationship with Elizabeth Wade White was distressing to Warner and pushed her relationship with Ackland to the edge. Ackland's distresses at loving two women simultaneously and of endeavouring to balance her feelings for each woman with the responsibilities and commitments of her primary relationship with Warner are presented openly in Ackland's poetry and in her memoir of this period. Ackland was struggling with additional doubts and conflicts during this period as well. She continued to battle her alcoholism, and she was undergoing shifts in her political and religious alliances.

In 1934, Ackland and Warner produced a volume of poetry, "Whether a Dove or a Seagull", an unusual and democratic experiment in writing, as none of the poems is ascribed to either author. The volume was also an attempt by Warner to introduce Ackland to publication since Warner had an already established reputation as a novelist, and her work was widely read in the 1930s. The volume was controversial for its frank discussion of lesbianism at a time and in a society in which lesbianism was deemed to be deviant and immoral behaviour.

In 1937, Ackland and Warner moved from rural Dorset to a house near Dorchester. Both became involved with Communist ideals and issues, with Ackland writing a column "Country Dealings" concerning rural poverty for the Daily Worker and the Left Review. In 1939, the two women attended the American Writers Congress in New York City to consider the loss of democracy in Europe and returned when World War II broke out. Ackland's poetry of this period attempted to capture the political dynamics she saw at work, but she had a difficult time as a poet mastering the craft of combining political polemics with her natural tendency toward lyrical expression. In a similar vein, her distress over the loss of democracy in Europe became a broader identification with Existentialism and the sense that the human condition itself was hopeless.

Ackland died at her home in Maiden Newton, Dorset, on 9 November 1969 from breast cancer that had metastasised to her lungs.

== Critical assessment ==
Ackland's poetry—largely neglected after the 1940s—came into a resurgence of interest with the emergence of both women's studies and of lesbian literature. Contemporary critical reaction finds much to value in Ackland's poetry and confessional writings, which are of historical interest to the development of self-reflective, modernist poetry, and to the political and cultural issues of the 1930s and 1940s. One example of a critical analysis is Wendy Mulford's book, This Narrow Place: Sylvia Townsend Warner and Valentine Ackland: Life, Letters and Politics, 1930–1951, Pandora, London, 1988. With regard to her self-reflection as a poet, Ackland exhibits themes and explorations similar to poets such as Sylvia Plath and Anne Sexton. Of interest, too, is Ackland's explorations of the personal effects of terminal illness as her life was drawing to a close from cancer. In her later years, Ackland turned from Catholicism to Quaker beliefs and also to involvement with issues of environmentalism.

In overall assessment, Mulford considers the two-minds at work in Ackland's work. She cites as examples Ackland's focus on optimism and dread, the longing for emotional closeness and the fear of intimacy, self-assertion and self-negation, the search for privacy and solitude amidst the longing for connection and social acceptance as a lesbian and as a noteworthy poet. In this regard, Ackland shares much thematically — although not in artistic achievement — with metaphysical poets such as John Donne and Philip Larkin in the effort to see personal experience from multiple perspectives while never fully resting with one perspective or another.

A contemporary examination of Ackland's poetry was published by Carcanet Press in 2008, titled Journey from Winter: Selected Poems. The volume is edited by Frances Bingham, who also provides a contextual and critical introduction.

== Works: monographs ==
- Whether a Dove or a Seagull; poems by Sylvia Townsend Warner and Valentine Ackland; New York: Viking, 1933, and London: Chatto & Windus, 1934. The entire text is reprinted in Journey from Winter: Selected Poems (2008)
- Country Conditions, London: Lawrence & Wishart, 1936; a contemporary study of rural conditions in Dorset first appearing as three articles in the Left Review; March, May and September 1935
- Twenty-Eight Poems by Valentine Ackland, privately printed by Clare, Son & Co, Wells, n.d.
- Later Poems by Valentine Ackland, privately printed by Clare, Son & Co, Wells, n.d.
- The Nature of the Moment, London: Chatto & Windus, 1973, and New York: New Directions, 1973
- Further Poems of Valentine Ackland, Beckenham: Welmont Publishing, 1978
- For Sylvia: An Honest Account, Methuen, London, 1986 and Norton, New York, 1986 (foreword by Bea Howe); a memoir written in 1949 concerning Ackland's early life, i.e., before meeting STW; her family, first loves and the beginnings of her alcoholism and the various attempts to cure it
- I'll Stand by You: Selected Letters of Sylvia Townsend Warner and Valentine Ackland with Narrative by Sylvia Townsend Warner, ed. Susanna Pinney, London: Pimlico, 1988
- Journey from Winter: Selected Poems, edited with introductions by Frances Bingham, Manchester: Carcanet, 2008

== Works: periodical and anthologized publications ==
- "Poor Shelter" (poem) - Time & Tide, 30 August 1930
- "Two Occasions" (stories) 1. After Good Friday 2. Morning Visit - London Mercury, February 1936
- A review of three books – Reporter in Spain, Frank Pitcairn; Spanish Front, Carlos Prieto; A Preliminary Official Report on the Atrocities in Southern Spain, issued by The National Government at Burgos - Left Review, December 1936
- "The Spanish Struggle" (book review of Behind the Spanish Barricades, John Langdon-Davies; Spain in Revolt, Gannes and Repard; Spain Today, Conze) - Left Review, January 1937
- "Weymouth Manoeuvres, 1936" (poem) - Life and Letters Today, Spring 1937
- “Two Pictures of the Spanish War” (book review of The War in Spain by Ramon Sender, and The Spanish Cockpit by Franz Borkenau) – Left Review, September 1937
- “On a Summer's Day” (story) – Lilliput, October 1940
- "Greek, the World's Tongue" (poem) - The New Yorker, 10 May 1941 (collected in TNOTM)
- "Teaching to Shoot" (poem) - The New Yorker, 27 February 1943 (collected in JFW)
- "Month of Liberation" (poem) - Our Time, May 1946
- “Recent Novels” (book review of Death Into Life, Olaf Stapledon; In Search of Stephen Vane, B. Ifor Evans; New Short Stories, 1945-6, John Singer, ed.; The Shoes Men Walk In, David Martin; You Forget So Quickly, Ashley Smith; Of Our Time, James Gordon) – Our Time, November 1946
- "Whinbury Camp" (poem) - West Country Magazine, Autumn 1946
- “A Multitude of the Heavenly Host” (story) – The Pleasure Ground : A Miscellany of English Writing, London: MacDonald & Co., 1947
- “Interviewing Miss Levison” (story) – Lilliput, February 1947
- “Sunlight on the Camp” (story) – Life and Letters (continuing The London Mercury), April 1947
- “When I was in Basle” (story) – Life and Letters, June 1947
- "Last Cockcrow" (poem) - The New Yorker, 20 March 1948 (uncollected)
- “New Novels” (book review of Emily, James Hanley; The Last Frontier, Howard Fast; Men of Forty-Eight, Jack Lindsay; The Forgotten World, William Goldman) – Our Time, September 1948
- “Waitress! Waitress!” (story) – Lilliput, July 1948 (also in The Bedside Lilliput, London: Hulton Press, 1951)
- “A Ghost was Born” (story) – Lilliput, October 1948
- “Granny Moxon” (essay) – The Countryman, Winter 1949
- “The Village Witch” (essay) – The West Country Magazine, 1949
- "The Flame of the Candle" (story) - The Journal of the Sylvia Townsend Warner Society, 2019:1 - first published ca. 1950 in Housewife
- “Dotty Detty” (essay) – The West Country Magazine, Autumn 1950
- “The First and the Last” (story) – The Countryman, Summer 1950
- "The Lesson" (poem) - The Countryman, Summer 1952
- “Winter of Content” (story) – The Countryman, Winter 1952
- “The Man in the Balloon” (story) – The New Statesman and Nation, July 24, 1954 - later in The Journal of the Sylvia Townsend Warner Society, 2019:1
- "A City Set on a Hill" (poem) - The Countryman, Summer 1954
- “Urn Burial” (story) – The Berkley Book of Modern Writing, No. 3, New York: Berkley Publishing Corp., 1956 (In This Narrow Place, Mulford notes this story first appeared in Modern Writing 1953 (eds P. Rahv and N. Philips). On pages 217–23 of TNP, she writes about this story, which seems to reflect Valentine's and Sylvia's disastrous visit to Connecticut in 1939.)
- "Lean with your Sight" (poem) - Peninsula: an Anthology of Verse from the West Country (London: Macdonald, 1957)
- “Cat Characteristics” (essay) – The Countryman, Winter 1958
- "The Rose That Never Killed" (poem) - The Bryanston Miscellany Bryanston School, 1958
- "All Soul's Night" (poem) - The Countryman, Autumn 1959
- "The most persuasive argument is there," (poem) - Aylesford Review, Winter 1962–63
- "March" (poem) - The Countryman, Spring 1964
- “Solomon Caesar Malan” (biographical essay) – Dorset Worthies 11 – Dorset Natural and Archaeological Society, 1962 – 1969
- "Into this brief and angry place" and "Reflections at the Telephone" (poems) - Genesis : Grasp, 1/3, 1969
- "Thomas the Cat" (essay) - n.d. - Newsletter 39 of The Sylvia Townsend Warner Society [2019]
- "Through a Glass Brightly" (sketch) - n.d. - Newsletter 39 of The Sylvia Townsend Warner Society [2019]
- "The Story of Captain Pompey" (children's story) - n.d. - Newsletter 39 of The Sylvia Townsend Warner Society [2019]

== Critical studies ==
- Wendy Mulford, This Narrow Place: Sylvia Townsend Warner and Valentine Ackland: Life, Letters and Politics, 1930-1951, London: Pandora, 1988
- Frances Bingham, editor, Journey from Winter: Selected Poems [by Valentine Ackland], Manchester: Carcanet, 2008
- Ailsa Granne, "Fantasy, Writing and Relationship in the Texts of Valentine Ackland and Sylvia Townsend Warner", Literature Compass, volume 11, issue 12, December 2014
- Peter Haring Judd, The Akeing Heart: Letters between Sylvia Townsend Warner, Valentine Ackland and Elizabeth Wade White, Reading; Handheld Press, 2018 (self-published in 2013)
- Peter Haring Judd & Ailsa Granne, "The End of the Affair: A Correspondence between Valentine Acklan and Elizabeth Wade White", Journal of The Sylvia Townsend Warner Society, 2019:1
- Ailsa Granne, Life-writing, Genre and Criticism in the Texts of Sylvia Townsend Warner and Valentine Ackland: Women Writing for Women, New York and London: Routledge, 2020 (reviewed by Janet Montefiore in The Journal of the Sylvia Towndsend Warner Society, 2023)
- David Trotter, "Posthuman? Animal Corpses, Aeroplanes and Very High Frequencies in the Work of Valentine Ackland and Sylvia Townsend Warner", Journal of The Sylvia Townsend Warner Society, 2020:1
- Frances Bingham, Valentine Ackland: A Transgressive Life, Bath: Handheld Press, 2021
