= The Corner That Held Them =

1948 novel by Sylvia Townsend Warner

First edition (publ. Chatto & Windus)

The Corner that Held Them is a historical novel by English writer Sylvia Townsend Warner, first published in 1948 by Chatto & Windus in London, with the American edition being published by Viking Press. It details the lives of the residents of Oby, a fictional medieval convent in the fenlands of Eastern England. The novel begins at Oby's establishment in 1163 and ends in 1382, encompassing multiple episodic stories surrounding the various residents of the convent. Although there is no conventional overarching plot, a running theme of the novel is the role of the Church in the economic oppression of the common people; Warner described it as a novel written "on the purest Marxist principles."

Warner typed 58 pages for an unfinished sequel that was spread between four gatherings. The novel was reviewed favourably, both in its original publication and on later reprintings, with many critics noting its unromanticized depiction of the medieval era.

== Summary ==
The novel describes the events at the convent of Oby, including the impact of the Black Death in 1349, the admission of a fake priest into the ranks, the ambitions of Oby's prioresses, and finally the Peasants' Revolt of 1381. The third-person narration freely wanders between the stories of different characters. The passage of time in the book can be roughly traced by the succession of prioresses, as well as the episodic adventures of various residents of Oby, denoted below with subheaders. Although the novel has no one plot, many events which occur in the beginning of the book are paralleled or referenced later, such as the reappearance of Jackie.

=== Establishment of Oby ===
Brian de Retteville, an English nobleman, murders his wife Alianor's lover. After her death years later, Brian establishes Oby using her inheritance. The Oby manor consists of marsh and moorland, difficult to farm, bordered by the Waxle Stream to the north-east. The resident serfs are not happy, as the inattentiveness of the previous lord allowed them more freedom. The first chapter loosely chronicles the first two hundred years of the convent, including a series of minor happenings such as the apostasy of a nun who runs away with a lover. The bulk of the narrative begins when the Black Death arrives at Oby in 1349.

=== Prioress Alicia ===
Prioress Alicia de Foley's rule is dominated by her ambition to build a spire on the nunnery. This frivolous, expensive plan is contrasted with the chaos and societal decline that occurs during and after the Black Death. As the plague spreads in nearby Waxelby, the convent's priest leaves them to perform last rites upon the dying, for fear of peasants confessing and shriving each other - ironically leaving the nuns in a similar situation when the Black Death reaches the convent.

A passing traveler, Ralph Kello, comes to the convent for alms. He lies, claiming that he is a priest; because he is highly educated, he is able to fool the nuns. After becoming ill, he raves in delirium that he is no priest, that he is damned. This sparks a rumor that he is not a priest, but he remains at the convent nevertheless.

Prioress Alicia goes about raising funds for her spire. This is difficult due to the shortage in labor following the plague, as well as the loss of the dowries of the nuns who died. The spire also runs into several obstacles due to the friction between the masons and the manor residents, as well as a variety of misfortunes, including deaths, murrains, and a flood. After the spire collapses and kills a nun, the prioress plots to sue the masons. Dame Johanna protests, and in rage Alicia beats her. Alicia resigns. Johanna is unexpectedly elected prioress over the favored candidate, Dame Matilda, seemingly out of pity.

==== Ursula, Jackie, and Pernelle Bastable ====
Ursula is a former nun who lives at Oby with her son, Jackie. Ursula is described as hard-working but foolish, and Jackie as intelligent, full of potential, were he not a bastard. Pernelle is also a servant at Oby. She grows close with Jackie, and as the convent falls into financial difficulties, she declares her departure. To everyone's shock, she takes Jackie with her, along with a horse and a large quantity of supplies.

==== Ralph Kello ====
Ralph Kello takes up falconry, but quickly loses his falcon. He goes on a quest to retrieve one from the estate of Lord Brocton, who recently died. At the Broctons, the Brocton widow forces him to listen to an unfinished epic poem which her deceased husband wrote (notably in English), Lay of Mamillion. She insists that he must bring this poem to London so it can be properly recognized as a great work. Ralph is amused, but largely forgets about the issue on his return.

=== Prioress Matilda ===
Matilda is forced to wait until Prioress Johanna's death to rise to prioress. She enjoys finances and business, and takes pride in pulling the convent out of debt. However, the impending visit of a bishop brings dread to Oby, as Ralph has begun to have sex with their former bailiff's widow, Magdalen Figg. During preparations for the visit, a nun murders the Widow Figg by pushing her into the fishpond, which Matilda turns a blind eye to. A young nun named Lilias receives a calling to become an anchoress. The bishop is unimpressed by Oby, which he finds full of indulgence, worldliness, and sloppy bookkeeping. He assigns them new novices, a new treasurer, and a custos to oversee their finances.

==== Henry Yellowlees ====
The custos, Henry Yellowlees, goes on a journey to collect back rent from Esselby, a distant landholding of the convent. On the way, he stays at a leper house helmed by a chaplain obsessed with music. Here he is profoundly moved by hearing them sing the Kyrie of Machaut, composed in the new polyphonic ars nova style. His journey is unsuccessful, and on the way back, he finds the leper house ransacked and burned, the chaplain murdered by his lepers.

==== The altarpiece ====
The bishop grows ill and calls for Dame Sibilla, a nun at Oby, to care for him. She unexpectedly rises to the occasion, although he ultimately passes away. The prioress decides to begin a new altarpiece to win favor with the new bishop. Dame Adela, a foolish young nun with no apparent talent, reveals that she is skilled at needlework, and the project of the altarpiece brings the convent together.

The increased taxes from the Hundred Years' War stoke resentment among the peasantry. Despite threats toward the convent, Dame Lovisa lets in an alms-seeker, a pregnant woman named Annis. Annis asks to see the altarpiece, and when Lovisa refuses, rants about the wastefulness of the church. This prompts Dame Adela to abscond with the unfinished altarpiece, aiming to sell it for charity. She discovers that the father of Annis' child is Jackie, the once-lodger at Oby. He tricks her into leaving them with the altarpiece and boarding a ship, bound for an unknown end.

Ralph Kello, now feebleminded with age, wanders away from the convent to bring the Lay of Mamillion poem to London, and dies in Lintoft.

The loss of the altarpiece is a huge blow to the convent, along with the losses incurred during a peasant's revolt: their bailiff, William Holly, has died defending the convent, and their altarplate is lost. This leaves the convent in a state of despair. Dame Lovisa, formerly the favorite for prioress, falls into ignominy and the elderly Dame Margaret is elected for lack of a better candidate.

=== Prioress Margaret ===
The prioress writes to the bishop asking permission to beg for alms to replace their altar plate. Dame Lilias and Dame Sibilla go to seek alms at the seashore. Sibilla wants to use her connections to the former bishop to convince the current bishop to grant Lilias' wish to become an anchoress. When Lilias admits that her calling was likely mistaken, Sibilla falls ill, leaving Lilias to beg on her own. As a group of pilgrims comes through town on their way to Jerusalem, Lilias contemplates becoming one. She sees Sibilla among the pilgrims, who explains that she is going by the will of God. Lilias decides not to go.

== Characters ==
Characters are listed in order of appearance. Some minor characters have been omitted due to the large volume of named characters.

- Alianor de Retteville - An adulterous noblewoman for whom Oby was founded.
- Brian de Retteville - Alianor's husband. Founds Oby with Alianor's inheritance.
- Richenda de Foley - Alianor's sister, a quarrelsome and litigious widow.
- Prioress Alicia de Foley - Loves beautiful things. Her life's work is building a spire on the convent.
- Prioress Johanna - A shy nun who is voted prioress out of pity.
- Prioress Matilda de Stapleton - A financially minded, highly pragmatic nun.
- Sir Ralph Kello - Oby's false priest. He feels guilt about his lie, but remains out of complacency.
- Magdalen Figg - Widow of the convent's bailiff.
- Ursula - A servant and former nun. Ursula is described as hard-working but dim.
- Jackie - Ursula's bastard son, raised among the nuns.
- Pernelle Bastable - A servant at Oby who runs away with Jackie.
- Bishop Walter Dunford - A bishop, loved by the poor, who disapproves of Oby's indulgence and sinfulness.
- Dame Sibilla - Cousin to Walter Dunford, a nun who serves as infirmaress.
- Dame Alice - Drowns the Widow Figg to avoid bringing shame on Oby.
- Dame Lilias - Receives a calling to become an anchoress.
- Dame Adela - A beautiful but foolish nun who excels at needlework.
- Dame Lovisa - A disfigured nun who is a favorite to become prioress.
- William Holly - The convent's second bailiff.
- Henry Yellowlees - the custos of Oby.
- Annis - A pregnant young woman who is a wandering beggar. She is partnered with Jackie.

== Publication ==
Warner worked on the novel from 1942 to 1947. The British edition was published by Chatto & Windus and the American edition was published by Viking Press, both in 1948. Warner appended a historical note to the Viking Press American edition which failed to appear in British editions. Virago Press republished the novel in London in 1988 with an introduction by Claire Harman, which was reproduced in 2019 by the New York Review Books. Warner said that the novel has no plot and that it is her favourite novel of those she wrote.

Warner explained in an interview that the novel was written based on Marxist principles, hence the extensive accounts of the convent's finances and the strained relationship between the manor residents and the nuns. In a note which was published in the Viking Press American edition of the book, Warner elaborates, writing that after the Black Plague, "The old cumbrous sleepy bargain of the manorial system [...] was replaced by the suppler but more cut-throat bargain of capital and labour." The novel's format, with events preceded by the year in which they occur, are a parody of medieval historiography, humorously subverting the dry style of medieval historic records.

Warner typed 58 pages for an unfinished sequel that was spread between four gatherings. The Journal of the Sylvia Townsend Warner Society by University College London published the unfinished sequel in two parts.

== Reception ==
The Corner That Held Them received largely positive reviews, both upon its initial release in 1948, and after its republications by feminist publisher Virago Press, and the 2019 reproduction of said release by the New York Review Books.

=== Contemporary ===
Robert Gorham Davis writing for The New York Times praised the novel in 1948 for its unromanticized depiction of the past and humane depiction of history. Orville Prescott, also writing for The New York Times, recommended the novel, called its depiction of Oby "as real and natural as the bustle and clatter of a modern office, as directly dependent on practical, economic conditions as a modern business." Kirkus Reviews said in 1948 that the novel "is an effective re-creation of a phase of medieval England", but that it lacks in the "deep emotional quality" compared to other historical novels like Helen Waddell's novel Peter Abelard and Sigrid Undset's Kristin Lavransdatter trilogy.

=== Modern ===
For its 2000 release by Virago, reviewer Philip Hensher described the book as 'one of the most remarkable examples of a novelist rethinking what she can do with the novel as a form'. Josephine Livingstone of The New York Times wrote in a 2019 review of the release by the New York Review Books that "Warner’s style is delicate and arch", comparing her to satirists like Barbara Pym and Evelyn Waugh. She described the novel as "a timely curative for our own, disruption-obsessed culture." Tobias Carroll praised the novel for Bomb Magazine, writing that the novel excelled in "blending the quotidian and irreverent in a novel about a nominally sacred space," subverting expectations with details like Dame Blanch, an adventurous nun who had "enjoyed the Black Death." Hermione Hoby gave a positive review in Harper's Magazine in 2020, writing that "What lends the novel vitality and inestimable charm is the fullness of Warners love for characters as unholy as us all." Commonweal said in 2020 that "Warner breathes a world into being through witty prose and vivid imagination". Rachel Mann, writing for Church Times in 2022, said that the novel has a plot, but that Warner's "point holds truth" due to "the way Townsend Warner’s real interest is in how the nuns of Oby are caught up in their own obsessions while the world moves on without them." In 2025, James Marriott wrote for The Times that it was "the best historical novel I have read," praising its "deftness and subtlety about the past." In an interview for Entertainment Weekly, Daniel M. Lavery said that the novel was "like sticking your face into a river and watching the fish and forgetting you have to breathe."

== Analysis ==
Warner wrote in her letters that she did not consider The Corner That Held Them to be a "historical novel" due to it not having a thesis. Regardless, some critics have analyzed the novel on a historical and allegorical level. Maud Ellman argues that the novel fulfills György Lukács' theory that the historical novel best functions by revealing the connection between the lives of individuals and historical events, challenging the notion of history as a "forward march."

=== Marxism ===
A major theme of the novel is the friction between the Church and the common people of Oby manor, and how the nuns' religious lives fit into this tense economic relationship. The inciting incident of the main part of the novel, the arrival of the Black Plague, is the catalyst for the beginning of modern capitalism and the decline of the feudal system. In the 1999 book The Novel in England, Robert L. Caserio posits that Warner's novel represents a force of literary modernism overshadowed by Joyceian modernism, calling Corner a "historical materialist, Leninist study of women and labour." Caserio argues that although Corner is less obviously experimental than its peers, it is no less revolutionary - primarily in its use of chance. By eschewing a conventional narrative arc, the novel embraces the influence of random chance and avoids imposing hierarchy or structure within itself. Thus, the novel resists the bourgeois individualism associated with the trope of the hero; every character lives and dies with near-equal importance. Similarly, Maud Ellman describes Warner's emphasis on the practices of daily life as comparable to the work of the Annales school of history, which emphasizes longterm changes in historical structure over chronicling major events, and the common characteristics of groups over the stories of individuals: as Warner states in the novel, a good convent should have "no history."

=== Art and music ===
Ellman also analyzes how Warner uses artwork to express Marxist values. Warner's descriptions of the waylaid altarpiece, eventually destroyed and lost to history, avoid fetishizing its monetary value, but instead focus on its value in terms of "the possibility of building community through collective work." In contrast, the chaplain at the leper house, who buys music and sings rather than feed the lepers, is gruesomely murdered when his charges ram a bone down his throat. In Gemma Moss's book Modernism, Music and the Politics of Aesthetics, she writes that Warner's works are "acutely aware of the material conditions in which music is produced and received, but [also] explore how aesthetic experiences can work on people without their knowledge, transmitting values or abstract concepts that shape a person’s thinking." The structure and harmonies of the new polyphonic Ars nova style relies on the hierarchy between notes, which reflects how the music is produced through the exploitation of the common people by the Church.

=== Fascism and WWII ===
Critics have compared the events of Corner with the rise of fascism in the early 20th century. Adam Piette writes that The Black Death can be seen as an analogy for the invisible rise of Nazi ideology and the rise of anti-fascism in female communities to meet it. In doing so, Warner subverts the anti-semitic use of Black Plague imagery by the Nazis. Jan Montefiore also analyzes the novel's historical context relative to WWII, comparing the novel to T. H. White's The Once and Future King. Both are works set in England's Middle Ages and were written during the Second World War. Although the historical setting seems like a form of escapism, the convent of Oby reveals itself to be no less corrupt than the present, resisting romantic medievalist tropes. Montefiore argues that Corner is a work of historical fiction which portrays the past as a work in progress, continually reconstructed with each generation. Ellman also draws connections between the Black Death and WWII, particularly the proliferation of aerial warfare and news of the war over mass media, which Warner compared in her diary to "a kind of pestilence." Ellman describes the novel's take on pastoralism as a reevaluation of English identity, one which rejects notions of racial purity or the nostalgic idea of "merry England."

=== Feminism ===
Corner has been described as a novel which explores the potential of an all-female community. Adam Piette argues that moments such as Alianor's stillness as her lover was killed and the nunnery's response to the Black Death are an allegory for "resistance to warmongering misogyny by a society of outsiders." Brian McKenna more broadly writes that the nunnery - founded under the auspice of Saint Leonard, the patron saint of prisoners - serves as a metaphor for female life under patriarchy. Francesca Wade, writing for The Paris Review, contextualizes Corner through one of the primary works Warner referenced in writing the novel, Eileen Power's Medieval English Nunneries. In Nunneries, Power emphasizes "the obscure lives and activities of the great mass of humanity."
