= Contre Sainte-Beuve =

Marcel Proust book of essays

- English 1st edition
- Author: Marcel Proust
- Language: French
- Genre: Modernist
- Publication date: 1954
- Publication place: France
- English publication date: 1958

Contre Sainte-Beuve (French: [kɔ̃tʁ sɛ̃t bœv], "Against Sainte-Beuve") is an unfinished book of essays written by Marcel Proust between 1895 and 1900 and first published posthumously in 1954. The book was discovered, with its pages in order, amongst Proust's papers after his death. It consists of several essays, three of which repudiate the body of work written by Charles Augustin Sainte-Beuve, a French literary critic active in the early to mid-nineteenth century.

Proust criticizes Sainte-Beuve's approach to biographical criticism, according to which a writer's work is primarily a reflection of their life and can be explained by it. This method, based on the search for an author's poetic intention and their personal qualities, based on the knowledge of their friends and acquaintances, dissatisfied Proust, who preferred a formalist criticism, a stylistic analysis focused on the literary work itself.

It was translated in 1958 by Sylvia Townsend Warner and entitled By Way of Sainte Beuve, published by Chatto & Windus.
