= Kingdoms of Elfin =

Book by Sylvia Townsend Warner

- First US edition
- Author: Sylvia Townsend Warner
- Illustrator: Anita Karl
- Language: English
- Publisher: Viking Press (US); Chatto & Windus (UK)
- Publication date: 1977
- Publication place: United Kingdom
- Media type: Print (hardback & paperback)
- ISBN: 978-0670413508

Kingdoms of Elfin is a short story collection by English writer Sylvia Townsend Warner, published by the Viking Press in 1977, a year before her death. Many of the stories appeared originally in The New Yorker during the 1970s. The stories are an interconnected series of satirical fantasy stories detailing the manners of the fairy courts of Europe. The collection was Warner's last published work.

The stories range across various traditional lands of Europe and beyond, including Brocéliande in Brittany, Elfhame in Scotland, Mynydd Preseli in Wales, the Forest of Arden and Bury St Edmunds in England, and as far away as the Peris of Persia.

== Contents ==
The collection includes sixteen stories, fourteen of which originally appeared in The New Yorker. Endpaper maps are by Anita Karl.

- "The One and the Other"
- "The Five Black Swans"
- "Elphenor and Weasel"
- "The Blameless Triangle"
- "The Revolt at Brocéliande"
- "The Mortal Milk"
- "Beliard"
- "Visitors to a Castle"
- "The Power of Cookery"
- "Winged Creatures"
- "The Search for an Ancestress"
- "The Climate of Exile"
- "The Late Sir Glamie"
- "Castor and Pollux"
- "The Occupation"
- "Foxcastle"

== Reception ==
In a review of The Dictionary of Imaginary Places by Alberto Manguel and Gianni Guadalupi, Naomi Mitchison described Kingdoms of Elfin as "the last and most brilliant of Sylvia Townsend Warner's books". Thomas M. Disch included Kingdoms of Elfin in his list of "modern classic" works of fantasy. Darrell Schweitzer described The Kingdoms of Elfin as containing "memorable flashes" and said that the stories "reveal new complexities on rereading".
