= Randall's Folly =

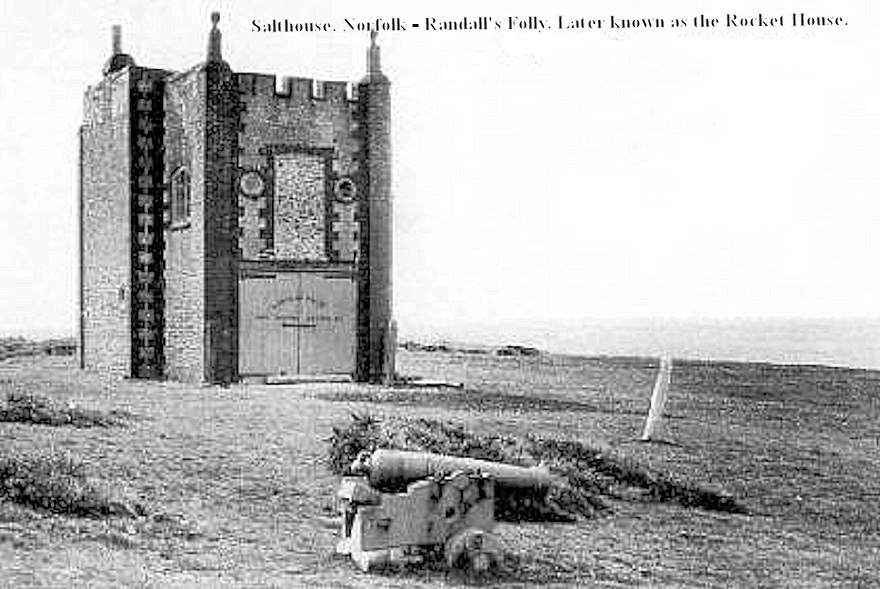
- The building in use as a Board of Trade rocket station, with its rocket-cannon in the foreground
- Interactive map of the Randall's Folly area
- Alternative names: Rocket House; Rocket Brigade House; Great Eye Folly
- Etymology: Onesiphorus Randall

General information
- Status: Demolished
- Type: Folly
- Location: Great Eye, Salthouse, England
- Coordinates: 52.956108°N 1.096808°E
- Demolished: June 1956

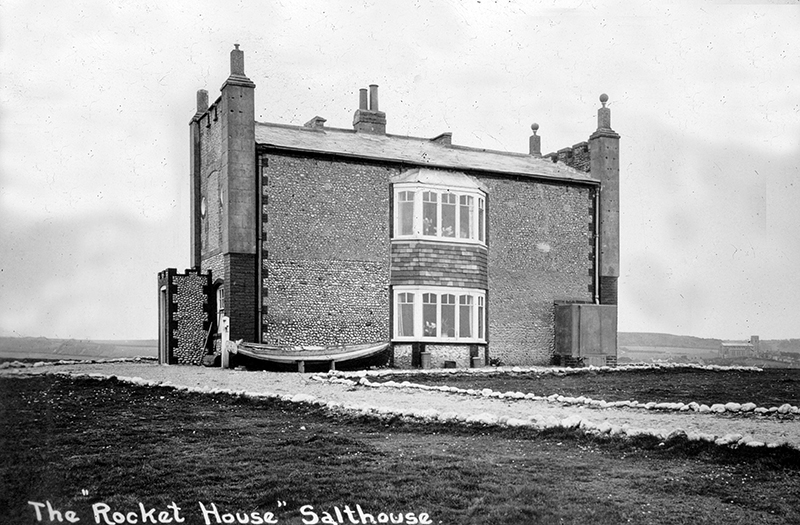
The Rocket House aka Randall's Folly

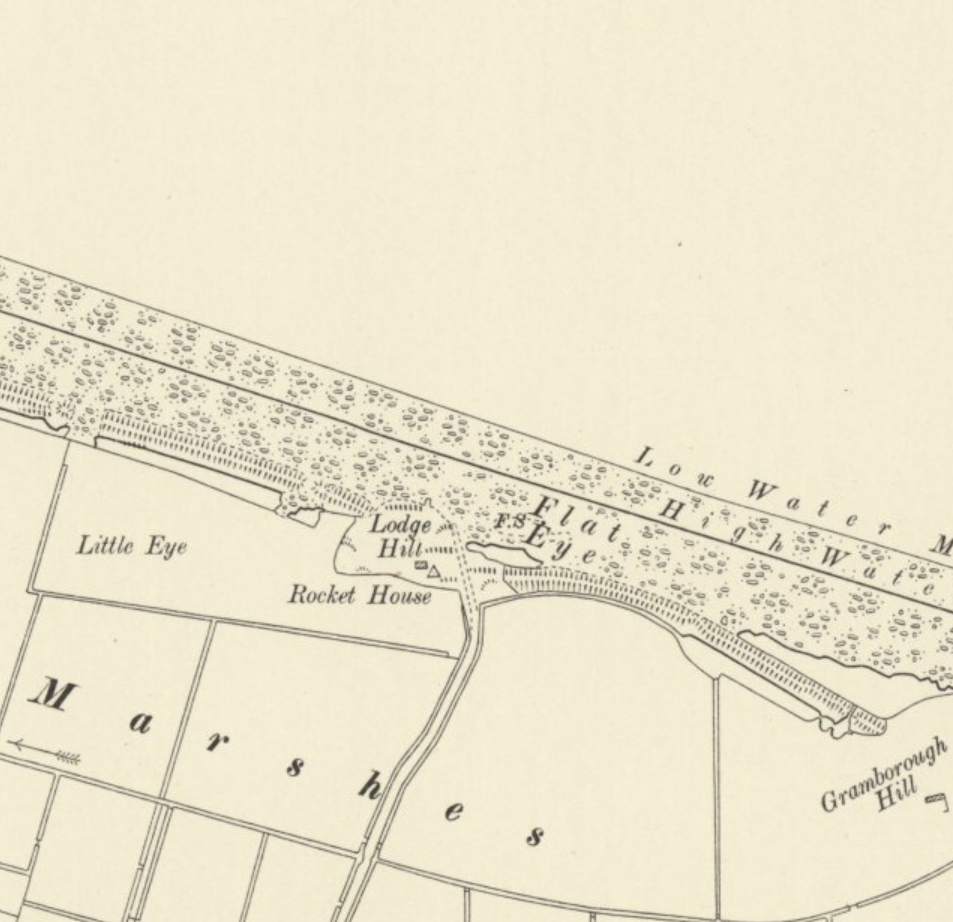
Rocket House, on Lodge Hill, on an Ordnance Survey six-inch (1888–1913) map

Randall's Folly was a building on the coast at Salthouse, Norfolk, England. No trace of it remains, largely because of coastal erosion.

Although called a folly, the building was habitable. It was built some time around 1860 by Onesiphorus Randall (1798–1873) – a locally born man who had made his fortune as a London property speculator – and sat on a mound of land called the "Great Eye" (shown on later maps as "Lodge Hill"). The ground floor comprised a pair of arches, each with a pair of large wooden doors, allowing Randall to drive his horse carriage in at one side and, after a stay, out from the other. Pictures show the building to be two-storey, with crenellated decoration.

After Randall's death, the building was purchased by the Board of Trade for use as a coastguard station, equipped with a rocket cart and an adjacent cannon, for the deployment of a breeches buoy. This led to the building being known as Rocket House.

From the 1920s, it was in use as a holiday home, known as Rocket Brigade House.

In 1937 it was purchased privately and again renamed, this time as Great Eye Folly. It was rented by the writer Sylvia Townsend Warner and her partner Valentine Ackland from 1950 to 1951, during which time Warner wrote her final novel The Flint Anchor (published 1954) there. She described the house in a 1950 letter to Alyse Gregory:

...I think Valentine will have told you about the Great Eye Folly. I have the oddest impressions of it, since we were only there for about fifteen minutes, and conversing all the time with its owners. But the first five of those minutes were enough to enchant me. It is the sort of house one tells oneself to sleep with, and sometimes I almost suppose that it is really one of my dream-houses, and no such solid little assertion of the rectangle breaks the long sky-line of salt-marsh and sea.

The building was badly damaged by the North Sea flood of 1953 and was demolished in June 1956.

A painting of the folly by John Arnesby Brown, titled The Watch Tower, was exhibited at the Royal Academy in 1923; the work is now in the Laing Art Gallery, who also hold a letter from Brown, describing the work's setting.
