= North Sea flood of 1953 =

31 January–1 February storm surge

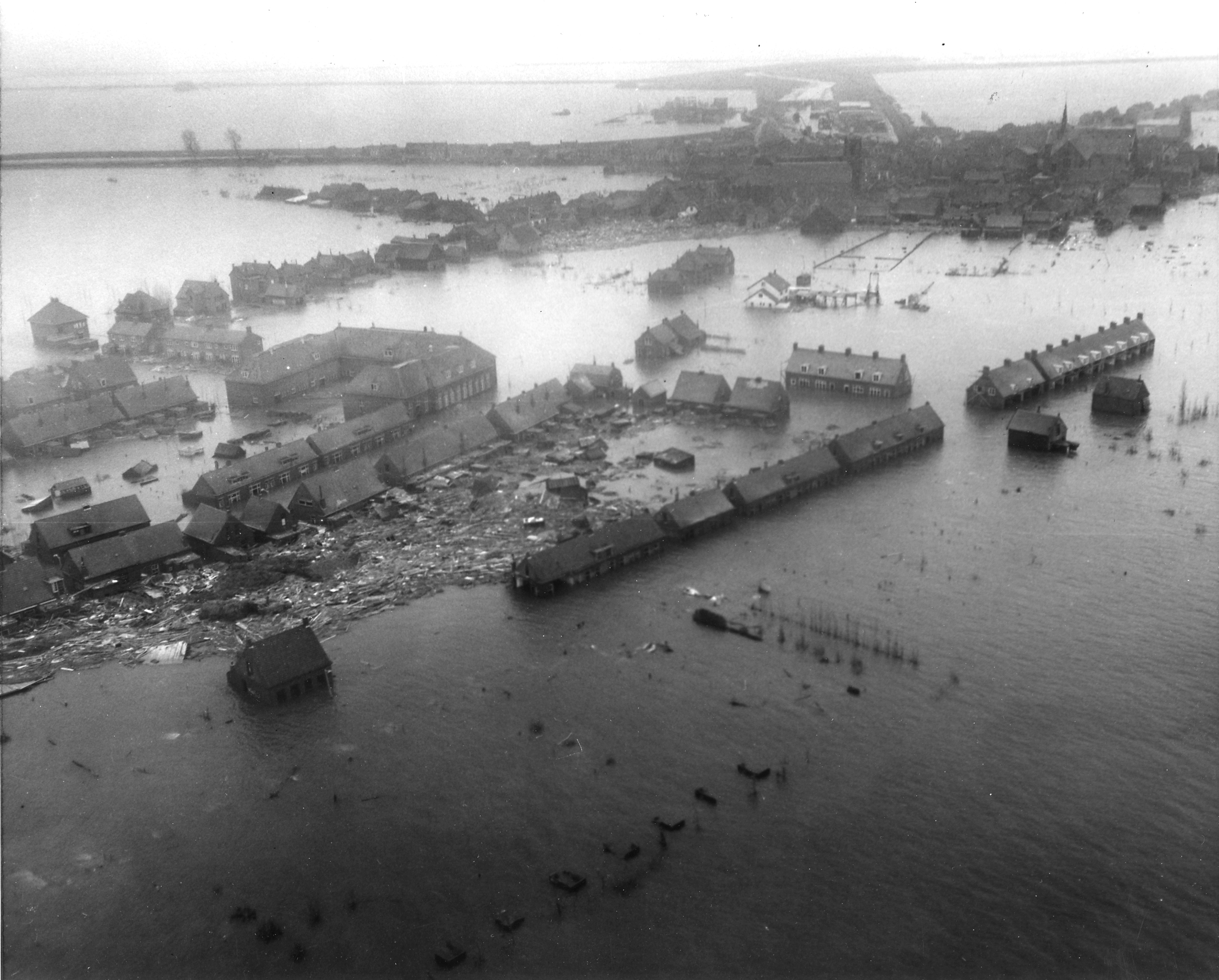
- Aftermath of the flood in Oude-Tonge, Goeree-Overflakkee, Netherlands

Meteorological history
- Duration: 31 January – 1 February 1953

Overall effects
- Fatalities: 2,551
- Damage: 9% of total Dutch farmland flooded, 187,000 animals drowned, 47,300 buildings damaged of which 10,000 destroyed
- Areas affected: the Netherlands, Belgium, and the United Kingdom

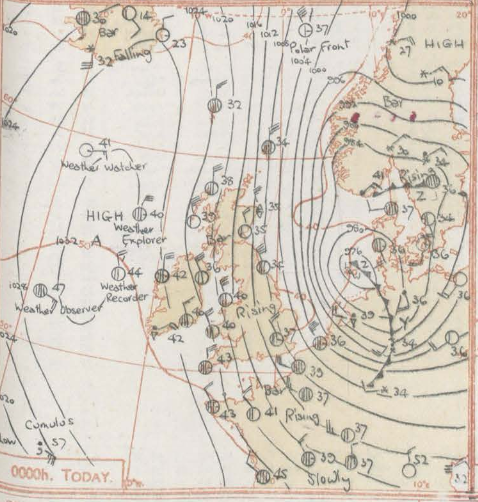
Synoptic chart at midnight 1 February 1953

The North Sea flood of 1953, also known as the Big Flood or East Coast Flood (in England) or as the Flood Disaster (Dutch: Watersnoodramp), was a flood caused by a heavy storm surge in the North Sea that struck low-lying coastal areas of the Netherlands, Belgium, and the United Kingdom. More than 2,000 people were killed on land and hundreds more at sea. It was the worst natural disaster of the 20th century in the United Kingdom and the worst in the Netherlands since the Middle Ages.

The storm and flooding occurred during the night of Saturday, 31 January to the morning of 1 February 1953. A combination of a high spring tide and a severe European windstorm caused a storm tide of the North Sea. Most sea defences facing the surge were overwhelmed, resulting in extensive flooding. The combination of wind, high tide, and low pressure caused the sea to flood land up to 5.6 metres (18 ft 4 in) above mean sea level.

Realising that such infrequent events could reoccur, the Netherlands and the United Kingdom carried out large studies on strengthening of coastal defences. The Netherlands developed the Delta Works, an extensive system of dams and storm surge barriers. The UK constructed storm surge barriers on the Thames Estuary and on the Hull where it meets the Humber Estuary.

== Flooding summary ==
At the time of the flood, 20% of the land of the Netherlands was below mean sea level (subsequently, with the expansion of Flevoland, this proportion has increased), and the next-highest 30% sat at less than 1 metre (3.3 ft) above sea level. Such land relies heavily on sea defences and was worst affected, recording 1,836 deaths and widespread damage. Most of the casualties occurred in the province of Zeeland.

In England, 307 people were killed in the counties of Lincolnshire, Norfolk, Suffolk and Essex. Nineteen were killed in Eastern Scotland.

Twenty-eight people were killed in the north of West Flanders, Belgium.

== Fatalities at sea ==
More than 230 deaths occurred on seacraft along Northern European coasts as well as on ships in deeper waters of the North Sea. The Stranraer–Larne car ferry MV Princess Victoria sank in the North Channel east of Larne with 134 fatalities, and many fishing trawlers sank. Nine small vessels foundered in the seas around the British Isles with the loss of all hands; these included the Swedish steamer Aspo (22 crew lost), the British steamer Yewvalley (12 crew lost), the British trawlers Sheldon (14 crew lost), Michael Griffith (13 crew lost) and Guava (eleven crew lost), the Dutch motor vessels Salland (nine crew lost) and Westland (eight crew lost), the Dutch trawler Catharina Duyvis (16 crew lost), and the Belgian trawler Leopold Nera (five crew lost).

== Netherlands ==
External videos
- Eerste beelden van de stormramp [First images of the storm] parts 1, 2 & 3 – Polygoon newsreel, 1–2 February 1953. Collection of Netherlands Institute for Sound and Vision. 1953 was the first time video was able to record the aftermath of a major flood.

From midday on 31 January 1953, water was driven from the northern reaches of the North Sea between Norway and Scotland by a strong northwest gale. A storm surge developed along the coast of the Netherlands, which coincided with a high spring tide, leading to many water levels on the Dutch coast on the morning of 1 February 1953 being higher than any previous recorded figures, particularly in the southwestern areas of the country. At 10:30 p.m. on Saturday evening 31 January, it was low tide but, this time, the water remained high. The strength of the hurricane had broken the tidal movement.

On the night of 1 February 1953 around 3 a.m., many dykes in the province of Zeeland and adjacent areas of South Holland and North Brabant proved unable to resist the floodwaters. On both islands and mainland, large areas of the country were flooded.

At 4 p.m. on 1 February, the flood reached a second high. The water rose even higher than during the first flood, and more dykes broke. Many people who had survived the first flood died, as the houses whose rooftops they had sheltered on collapsed due to the persistent water pressure. At that time, the government did not yet know that Schouwen-Duiveland, Goeree-Overflakkee and Tholen were almost completely under water, and no large-scale rescue operations had yet taken place. The depression of the storm was not exceptionally deep compared to previous storms and floods in the Netherlands, such as those which occurred in 1894, 1906 and 1916. However, the storm track was substantially different and propagated at a markedly slower rate than those events. The storm moved east from the Atlantic to the north of Scotland, then curved sharply to propagate into the German Bight, progressing in a south-eastern direction over land. As a result, storm winds from the northwest were stronger and more sustained than the previous events, leading to a higher and longer surge.

Only on Monday 2 February were fishermen the first to sail deep into the disaster area to save hundreds of people. Rescue operations from the air were hardly possible: the Netherlands had only 1 helicopter and had to wait until other countries offered help.

On Tuesday 3 February, a large flow of people and relief supplies started. Planes dropped sandbags, dinghies, boots, food and water over the disaster area. At the same time, thousands of Dutch soldiers, administrators, aid workers and volunteers arrived to carry out coordinated actions in the disaster area. Tens of thousands of residents were being evacuated from the area to shelters elsewhere in the country. Foreign helicopters and amphibious vehicles also came into action on Tuesday, but the vast majority of rescue operations had already been completed by then.

Donations and relief supplies were pouring in at the National Disaster Fund in The Hague. Other countries, including Britain, Sweden and Canada, sent more than 61 million guilders in relief supplies.

Many people still commemorate the dead during the Herdenking Watersnoodramp on 1 February.

=== Warnings ===
Rijkswaterstaat had warned about the risk of a flood. At the time of the flood, none of the local radio stations broadcast at night, and many of the smaller weather stations also only operated during the day. The following broadcast from the Royal Netherlands Meteorological Institute (KNMI) was made at 6.15pm (18:15) on 31 January 1953 on Hilversum Radio:

Over the northern and western parts of the North Sea, a strong gale rages between northwest and west. The storm field is extending further. It is expected that the storm will continue for the whole night, and given this fact, this afternoon at 5.30pm the areas of Rotterdam, Willemstad and Bergen op Zoom have been warned for dangerous high water.

— "Hilversum Radio broadcast, Saturday January 31, 6.15pm", January 31, 1953 and 9/11: Living with risk (2019)

Another warning was broadcast shortly before midnight on 31 January 1953, followed by the Wilhelmus, after which broadcasts ceased for the evening, as was standard in the Netherlands at the time. As a result, the warnings of the KNMI did not penetrate the flood-threatened area in time. People were unable to prepare for the impending flood. The disaster struck on a Saturday night, and hence many government and emergency offices in the affected area were not staffed.

As telephone and telegraph networks were disrupted by flood damage, amateur radio operators went into the affected areas with their equipment to form a voluntary emergency radio network. These radio amateurs provided radio communications for 10 days and nights, and were the only people able to maintain contact from affected areas with the outside world.

=== Resulting damage ===
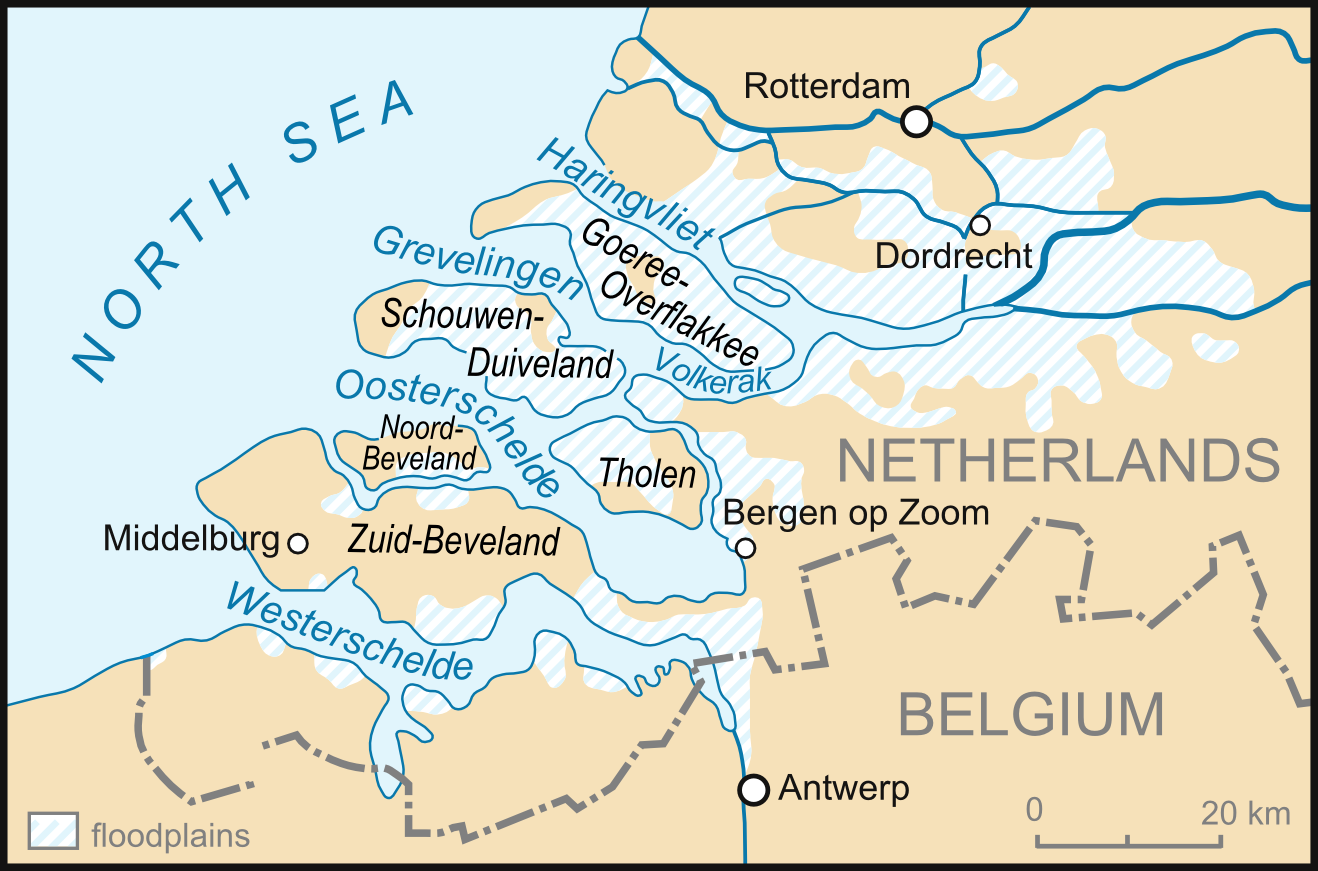
Extent of flooding in the Netherlands

The Zeeland dykes were breached in 67 locations. Large parts of South Holland, Zeeland and North Brabant were inundated. In North Holland only one polder was flooded. The most extensive flooding occurred on the islands of Schouwen-Duiveland, Tholen, Sint Philipsland, Goeree-Overflakkee, the Hoeksche Waard, Voorne-Putten and Alblasserwaard. Parts of the islands of Zuid-Beveland, Noord-Beveland, IJsselmonde, Pernis, Rozenburg, Walcheren and Land van Altena were flooded, as well as parts of the areas around Willemstad, Nieuw-Vossemeer and parts of Zeelandic Flanders.

The highest death tolls were recorded on the islands of Schouwen-Duiveland and Goeree-Overflakkee. 305 people drowned in the village of Oude-Tonge. 20-year-old Jos de Boet from Oude-Tonge lost 42 family members in the disaster. 200,000 animals died, 3,500 houses and farms were lost in the flood, and another 43,000 were severely damaged.

Afterwards, the government formed the Delta Commission to study the causes and effects of the floods. They estimated that flooding killed 1,835 people and forced the emergency evacuation of 70,000 more. Floods covered 9% of Dutch farmland, and sea water flooded 1,365 km^{2} (527 sq mi) of land. An estimated 30,000 animals drowned, and 47,300 buildings were damaged, of which 10,000 had to be demolished (or were swept away). The total damage is estimated at 1 billion Dutch guilders.

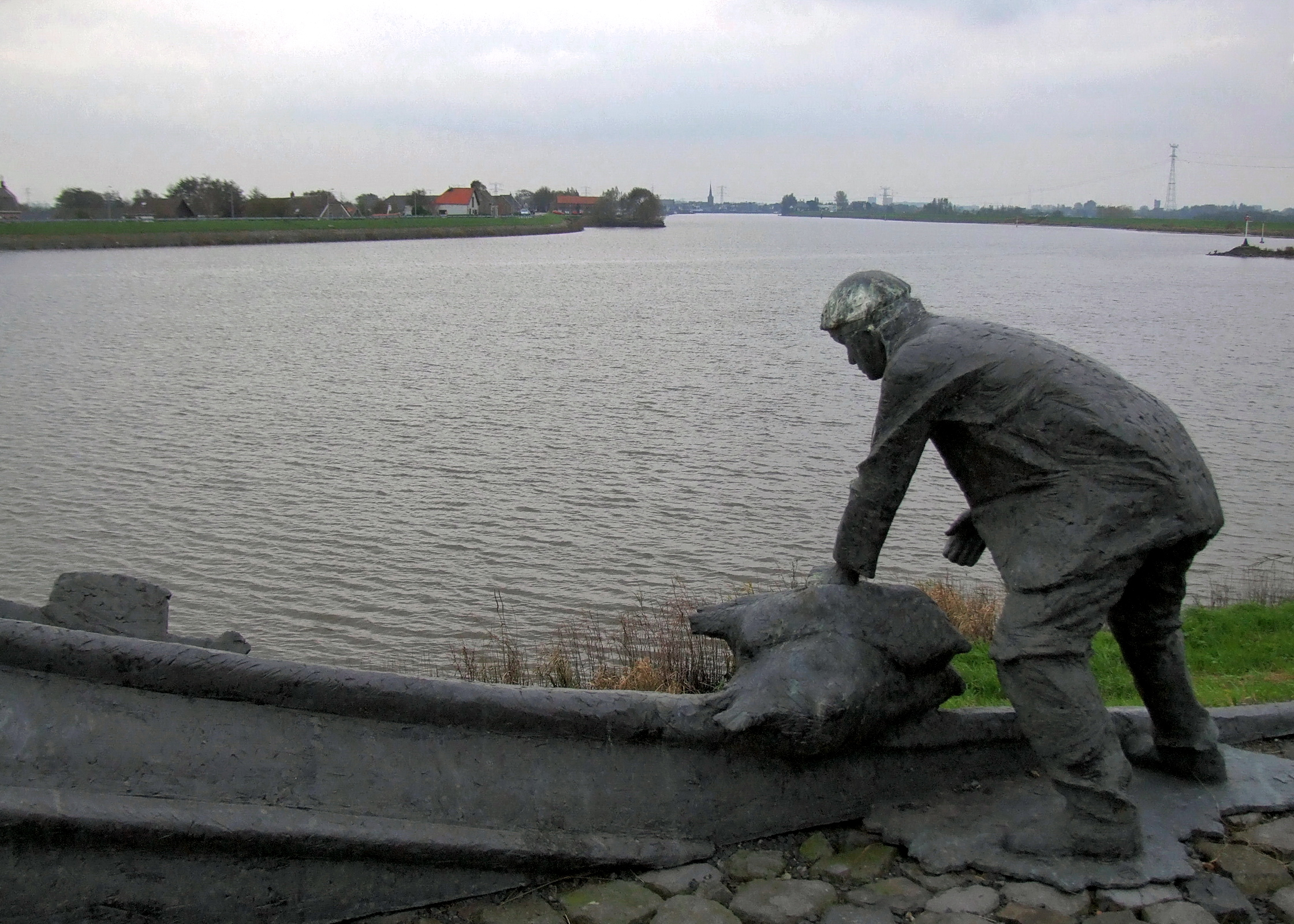
Een dubbeltje op zijn kant ("A dubbeltje on its edge", meaning 'a narrow escape'), a sculpture by Roel Bendijk of de Twee Gebroeders in the Groenedijk. 'Dubbeltje' (lit. 'little double') was a thin, former Dutch coin

==== Near flooding of other parts ====
The Schielands Hoge Zeedijk (Schielands High Seadyke) along the river Hollandse IJssel was all that protected three million people in the provinces of North and South Holland from flooding. A section of this dyke, known as the Groenendijk, was not reinforced with stone revetments. The water level was just below the crest and the seaward slope was weak.

Volunteers worked to reinforce this stretch. However, the Groenendijk began to collapse under the pressure around 5:30 am on 1 February. Seawater flooded into the deep polder. In desperation, the mayor of Nieuwerkerk commandeered the river ship de Twee Gebroeders ('The Two Brothers') and ordered the owner to plug the hole in the dyke by navigating the ship into it. Fearing that the ship might break through into the polder, Captain Arie Evegroen took a row boat with him. The mayor's plan was successful, as the ship was lodged firmly into the dyke, reinforcing it against failure and saving many lives.

The Afsluitdijk across the entrance of the Zuiderzee was said to have paid for its construction cost in that one night, by preventing destructive flooding around the three great lakes that used to be the Zuiderzee.

=== Reaction ===
Several neighbouring countries sent soldiers to assist in searching for bodies and rescuing people. The United States Army sent helicopters from Germany to rescue people from rooftops. Queen Juliana and Princess Beatrix visited the flooded area only a few days after. A large aid program, the National Relief Fund, was launched, and soldiers raised funds by selling pea soup door to door. Internationally, 100,000 commemorative postcards, featuring an illustration by Eppo Doeve, were sold. A national donation program was started and there was a large amount of international aid. The Red Cross was overwhelmed by contributions, and diverted some of the funds to assist residents of Third World countries.

It was found that the flooding could have been 4 feet (1.2 m) higher; the Rijkswaterstaat's plan concerning the protection and strengthening of the dikes was accepted. As a result, authorization was granted for the Delta Works, an elaborate project to enable emergency closing of the mouths of most estuaries, to prevent flood surges upriver.

== United Kingdom ==
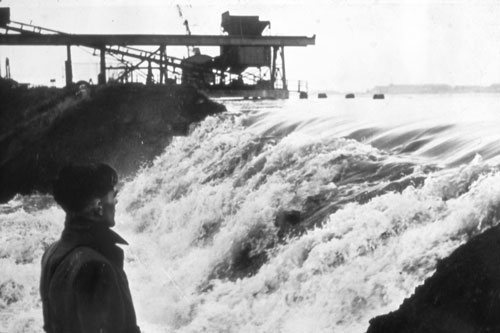
A breach at Erith after the 1953 flood

The North Sea flood of 1953 was the worst flood of the 20th century in England and Scotland. Over 1,600 km (990 mi) of coastline was damaged, and sea walls were breached in 1,200 places, inundating 160,000 acres (65,000 ha; 250 sq mi). Flooding forced over 30,000 people from their homes, and 24,000 properties were greatly damaged. The damage is estimated as £50 million at 1953 prices, approximately £1.2 billion at 2013 prices.

Probably the most devastating storm to affect Scotland for 500 years, the surge crossed between Orkney and Shetland. The storm generated coastal and inland hazards, including flooding, erosion, destruction of coastal defences, and widespread wind damage. Damage occurred throughout the country, with 19 fatalities reported. The fishing village of Crovie, Banffshire, built on a narrow strip of land along the Moray Firth, was abandoned by many, as large structures were swept into the sea. Over 200 telephone lines were blown down in the North and North-East of Scotland, from Dundee to Inverness and Aberdeen.

The surge raced down the east coast into the mid-to-southern North Sea, where it was amplified by shallower waters.

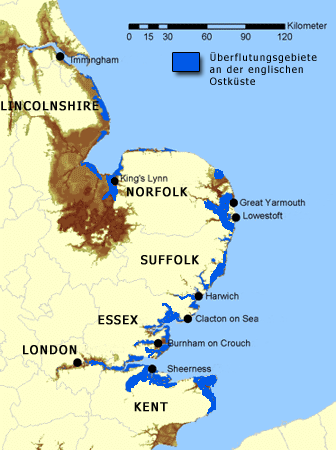
Illustration of the flooded areas in England

Canvey Island in Essex was inundated, with the loss of 58 lives. Some 41 people died at Felixstowe in Suffolk when wooden prefabricated homes in the West End area of the town were flooded. Another 37 died when the seafront village of Jaywick near Clacton was flooded.

In Lincolnshire, flooding occurred from Mablethorpe to Skegness, reaching 3 kilometres (2 miles) inland. Police Officers Charles Lewis and Leonard Deptford received George Medals for their part in rescue work. Lewis leapt from a police station upper window to save an elderly couple being swept away in 3 feet (1 m) of floodwater, carrying them to a house across the road to safety, then continuing rescue work for hours until he found a working telephone to call for help. Deptford was off-duty at his son's party when the wall of water hit. He realised that elderly people were vulnerable as the sea wall was breached and he dragged and carried many to safety. At one house he found a bedridden elderly couple with their middle-aged daughter; in the waist-high floodwater, he lashed together oil cans to make a raft, to which he tied the couple and pulled them to safety. He carried on into daylight, his last rescue being a dog.

Reis Leming, an American airman, and United States Air Force Staff sergeant Freeman A Kilpatrick were also awarded the George Medal for rescuing respectively 27 and 18 people at South Beach, Hunstanton. At Salthouse the Victorian Randall's Folly was badly damaged, resulting in its subsequent demolition.

In south-west Essex, water overspilled the Royal Docks into Silvertown, where it drained into the sewers but flooded back in Canning Town and Tidal Basin. William Hayward, a night watchman at William Ritchie & Son, died of exposure to gas from a damaged pipe – the only fatality in London. Almost 200 people were homeless and took refuge at Canning Town Public Hall. The village of Creekmouth on Barking Creek, the mouth of the Roding, was wholly flooded by the sea surge and later demolished. Residents were relocated elsewhere in Barking.

The total death toll on land in the UK is estimated at 307. The total death toll at sea for the UK, including the 135 lost in the sinking of MV Princess Victoria, is estimated at 224.

== Belgium ==
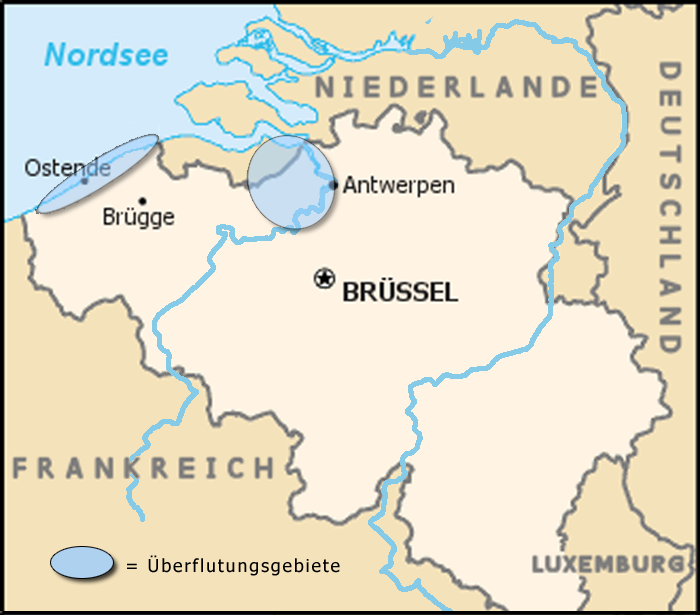
Affected areas of Flanders

The coastal defences of Flanders were severely damaged. Near Ostend, Knokke and Antwerp, heavy damage was done to the sea defence with local breaches. Twenty-eight people died.

== Responses ==
After the 1953 flood, governments realised that similar infrequent but devastating events were possible in the future. In the Netherlands the government conceived and constructed an ambitious flood defence system beginning in the 1960s. Called the Delta Works (Dutch: Deltawerken), it is designed to protect the estuaries of the rivers Rhine, Meuse and Scheldt. The system was completed in 1998, with completion of the storm surge barrier Maeslantkering in the Nieuwe Waterweg, near Rotterdam.

In the UK, the Permanent Secretary to the Home Office, Sir Frank Newsam, coordinated the immediate efforts to defend homes, save lives and recover after the floods. After the flooding, the government made major investments in new sea defences. The Thames Barrier programme was started to secure Central London against a future storm surge; the Barrier was officially opened on 8 May 1984. A range of flood defence measures were initiated around the UK coast.

== Remembrance ==
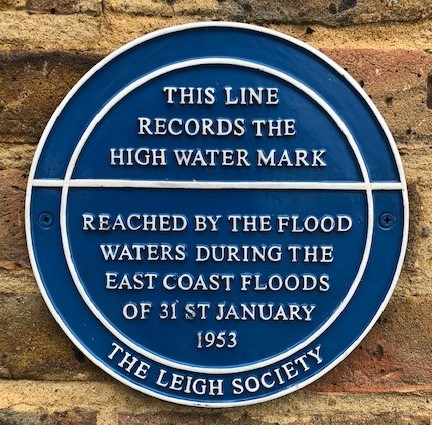
Blue plaque in Leigh-on-Sea commemorating the flood

In 2013, a service was held at Chelmsford Cathedral to mark the 60th anniversary of the Great Flood, attended by Anne, Princess Royal. Acts of remembrance were also held in Lincolnshire, Norfolk, Suffolk and Essex.

A blue plaque marking the level of the flood water was installed by the Leigh Society on the wall of the Heritage Centre in Leigh-on-Sea to commemorate the flooding there.

There is also a blue plaque marking the height of the flood water at Sutton-on-Sea in Lincolnshire.

In 2011, 58 years after the flood, a service of remembrance was held outside the library on Canvey Island in Essex to unveil a plaque commemorating the 58 people who lost their lives on the island.

The Watersnoodmuseum or Flood Museum in Ouwerkerk, Netherlands opened in 2001 as the "National Knowledge and Remembrance Centre for the Floods of 1953".

== Books, films and music ==
- The composition Requiem Aeternam 1953 by Douwe Eisenga was written as a commemoration of the flood.
- The composition Noye's Fludde of 1958 by Benjamin Britten evokes the memory of the North Sea flood.
- The Dutch public broadcasting foundation has made numerous documentaries about the North Sea Flood. Two have been adapted as English versions: The Greatest Storm and 1953, the Year of the Beast.
- The 1953 book Houen, jongens! by Klaas Norel is a novelization of the flood in Noord-Beveland. It was translated into English as Stand by, Boys! (Eerdmans, 1955).
- BBC Timewatch made a documentary about the North Sea flood of 1953, called The Greatest Storm. BBC Radio Four broadcast in 2023 an account of the flood and lessons learned, such as the Thames Barrier: Learning From the Great Tide - BBC Sounds
- An episode of the ITV series Savage Planet featured the flood.
- The 1953 floods were mentioned in detail in the drama film Flood (2007).
- In 2009 a Dutch action drama titled De Storm (The Storm) was released.
- In 2018 a Dutch documentary titled Stormvloed in De Schelphoek ("Storm surge in the Schelphoek") was released.
- The book The Little Ark by Jan de Hartog, published in 1953, depicted the flood. It was adapted as a film by the same name in 1972.
- The short story "The Netherlands Lives with Water", by Jim Shepard, contains a passage describing the event.
- The 1976 book Oosterschelde, windkracht 10, by Jan Terlouw is the story of the flood in Zeeland, Netherlands. The first part describes the storm, while the second part describes the later conflicts about constructing the Delta Works.
- Penelope Fitzgerald, The Bookshop (1978), set in Suffolk in 1959, makes many references back to the 1953 flooding.
- The 2012 non-fiction book, The Sugar Girls, by Duncan Barrett and Nuala Calvi, describes the effects of the flood in East London, and on workers at Tate & Lyle's East End factories.
- The flood and its effect upon the coastal town of Lowestoft is the subject matter of a painting by British artist Mark Burrell.
- 'The Great Tide' by Hilda Grieve (published 1959) gives a detailed description of every aspect of the flood in Essex. The author was an experienced historian, commissioned by the Essex County Council.

== See also ==
- Flood control in the Netherlands
- Floods in the Netherlands
- Inundation of Walcheren
- Lists of disasters
- List of floods in Europe
- List of natural disasters in the British Isles
- List of disasters in Great Britain and Ireland by death toll
- North Sea flood of 1962
- North Sea flood of 2007
- North Sea flood of 2013
- Radio Amateurs Emergency Network
- Storm tides of the North Sea
