= Harrow History Prize =

Annual history competition for children at British preparatory schools

The Harrow History Prize or the Townsend Warner Preparatory Schools History Prize is an annual history competition for children at British preparatory schools.

== History ==
The prize was established in 1885 by E. E. Bowen, a housemaster at Harrow School. He wanted to encourage a move away from purely classical education and offered a prize in history to pupils of Elstree Preparatory School. In 1895 the Dragon School also started to take part, and the competition had spread to thirteen other schools by 1905 with 39 entrants taking part that year. In 1905, George Townsend Warner, head of history at Harrow (and father of Sylvia Townsend Warner), took on the running of the competition until his death in 1916. Over many years the prize was repeatedly won by St Cyprian's School whose Headmistress Mrs Vaughan Wilkes was a great believer in history teaching and in the prize itself. After 1916 administration was shared between Mr Henry of Harrow and Henry Marten, later Sir Henry Marten, of Eton and the prize was renamed after Townsend Warner. In 1940 the number of participating schools had risen to 40, by which time both Henry and Marten had withdrawn. There were difficulties during World War II because of the disruption this caused to prep schools, but the competition was kept running by Major C F Letts until 1956 when the Independent Association of Preparatory Schools (IAPS) took over. By this time there were 70 schools and over 500 entrants in the competition. The competition has continued to grow since then, and a special centenary competition was run in 1985.

== Winners ==
Notable winners, both from St Cyprian's, included Dyneley Hussey (1905) and Cyril Connolly (1916), with his colleague Eric Blair (George Orwell) in second place. Orwell later wrote scathingly of the prize as a "piece of nonsense". Another runner up was the historian Arthur Bryant, at the time studying at Westminster Under School. British Conservative Party politician Kwasi Kwarteng is also a recipient of the prize as he won it in 1988 while studying at Colet Court.

== Papers 1 and 2 ==
There are two exams in this competition, Paper 1 consisting of testing of dates and battles, and 2 is made up of essays.
