= Sylvia Townsend Warner =

English writer, poet, and activist (1893–1978)

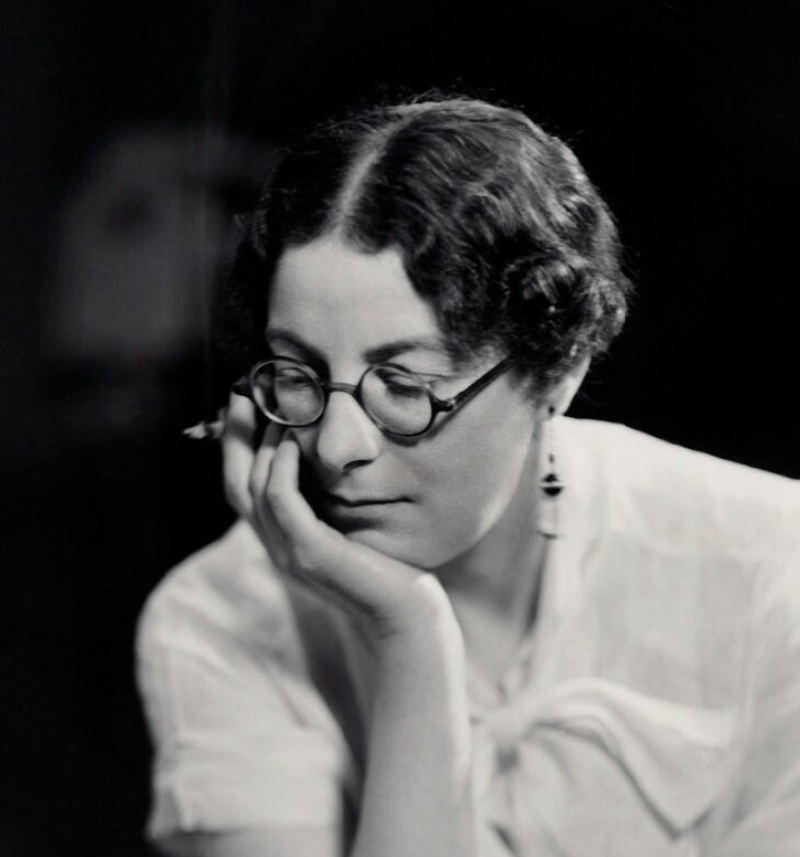
- detail, by Howard Coster, 1934
- Born: Sylvia Nora Townsend Warner; 6 December 1893; Harrow on the Hill, Middlesex, England
- Died: 1 May 1978 (aged 84)
- Occupation: Writer
- Partner: Valentine Ackland
- Writing career
- Genres: Novel, poetry

Sylvia Nora Townsend Warner (6 December 1893 – 1 May 1978) was an English novelist, poet and musicologist, known for works such as the novels Lolly Willowes (1926) and The Corner That Held Them (1948), and the short story collection Kingdoms of Elfin (1977). She spent most of her adult life in partnership with the poet Valentine Ackland.

== Early life and family ==
Sylvia Townsend Warner was born at Harrow on the Hill, Middlesex, the only child of Eleanor "Nora" Mary (née Hudleston) and her husband George Townsend Warner. Her father was a house-master at Harrow, one of the most prestigious British "public" (independent) schools, and was associated with an award which was posthumously renamed the Townsend Warner History Prize.

As a child, Townsend Warner was home-schooled by her father after being expelled from kindergarten for mimicking the teachers. She was musically inclined, and, before World War I, planned to study in Vienna under Schoenberg. She enjoyed a seemingly idyllic childhood in rural Devonshire. In 1914, following the outbreak of World War I, Warner moved to London and she worked in a munitions factory. She was strongly affected by her father's death in 1916.

Between 1875 and 1895, Warner's paternal grandfather, The Reverend George Townsend Warner, was headmaster of Newton Abbot Proprietary College in Devon where he taught Arthur Quiller Couch, Bertram Fletcher Robinson, Paris Singer and Percy Fawcett.

== Adult life ==
In 1923, Warner met Theodor Francis "T. F." Powys, a novelist and short story writer, whose writing influenced her own and whose work she in turn encouraged. The two became friends, and her debut novel, Lolly Willowes, was published shortly after in 1926. From her first work, it was clear that Warner's focus was on subverting societal norms; she would later heavily use the themes of rejecting the Church, a need for female empowerment, and independence in her works. It was at Powys' home that Warner first met Valentine Ackland, a young poet; the two women fell in love, moving in together in 1930 and eventually settling at Frome Vauchurch, Dorset, in 1937. Her relationship with Ackland inspired many of her works, and the couple collaborated on a collection of poems, Whether a Dove or a Seagull, published in 1933.

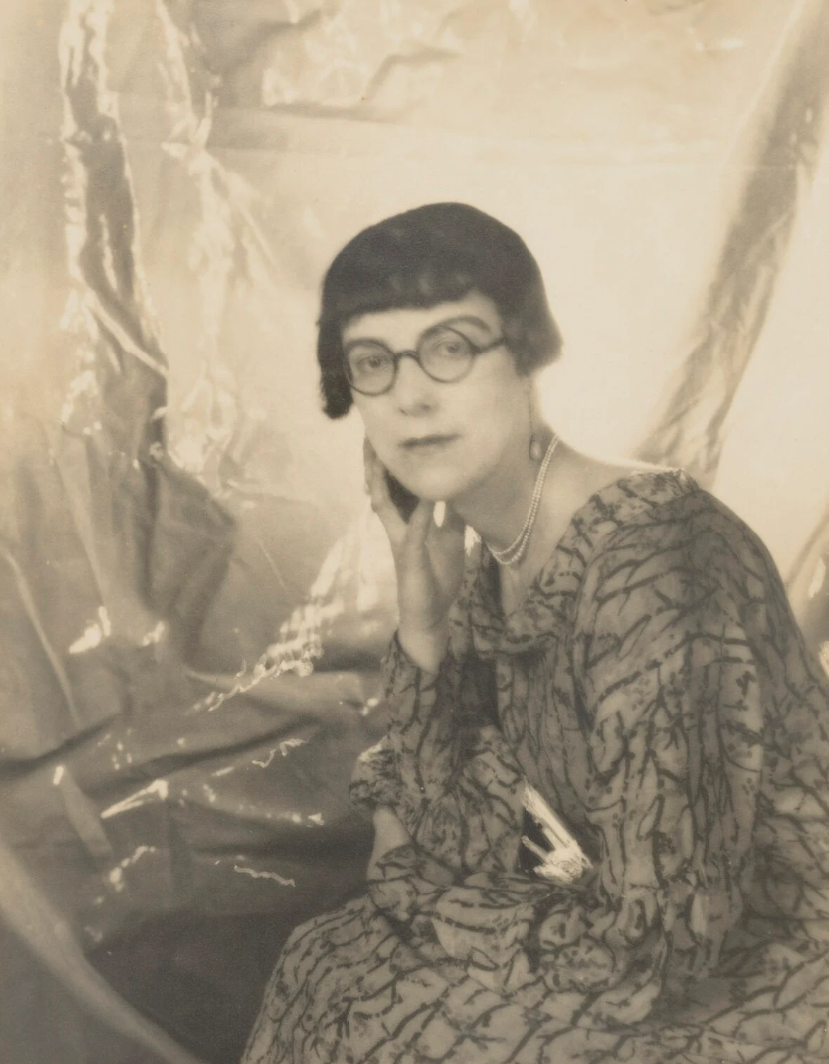
Sylvia Townsend Warner in 1930 by Cecil Beaton

Warner and Ackland's relationship was a tumultuous one, in part due to Ackland's infidelity, which included an affair with fellow writer Elizabeth Wade White. Alarmed by the growing threat of fascism, they were active in the Communist Party, and Marxist ideals found their way into Warner's works. She participated in the Second International Congress of Writers for the Defence of Culture, held in Valencia between 4 and 17 July 1937, while serving in the Red Cross as part of the international response to the Spanish Civil War. When the Second Spanish Republic fell in 1939, Warner and Ackland returned to England, living there together until Ackland's death in 1969.

E. M. Delafield portrayed a visit to Warner in 1931 in her The Provincial Lady Goes Further describing her as "novelist, famous in two continents for numerous and brilliant contributions to literature" and giving her and Ackland the pseudonyms "Carina/ Charlotte Volley" and "Miss Postman".

In 1937, Warner and Ackland moved to a house called Riversdale beside the River Frome in Frome Vauchurch near Maiden Newton. They initially rented the house and did not intend to stay there long; however, they bought it in 1946 and they lived there for the rest of their lives. In 1950 and 1951, they also rented Great Eye Folly at Salthouse, where Warner wrote her final novel, The Flint Anchor (published 1954).

After Warner's death in 1978, her ashes were buried with Ackland's at St Nicholas, Chaldon Herring, Dorset.

== Work ==
Early in her career Warner researched 15th and 16th century music. From 1917 she was in regular employment as one of the editors of Tudor Church Music, ten volumes published by Oxford University Press in the 1920s with the support of the Carnegie UK Trust. The lead editor was initially Sir Richard Terry, who, as the Master of Music at Westminster Cathedral, had been a pioneer in the revival of Tudor vocal repertoire. Warner obtained the work as the protegee of her lover and music teacher Sir Percy Buck, who was on the editorial committee.

Warner was involved in travelling to study source material and in transcribing the music into modern musical notation for publication. Warner wrote a section on musical notation for the Oxford History of Music (it appeared in the introductory volume of 1929). Music critic Richard Aldrich highlighted her contribution as particularly "lucid and intelligible".

Her first published book was the 1925 poetry collection The Espalier, which was praised by A. E. Housman and Arthur Quiller-Couch. She was encouraged to write fiction by David Garnett. Warner's novels included Lolly Willowes (1926), Mr Fortune's Maggot (1927), Summer Will Show (1936), and The Corner That Held Them (1948). Recurring themes are evident in a number of her works. These include a rejection of Christianity (in Mr Fortune's Maggot, and in Lolly Willowes, where the protagonist becomes a witch); the position of women in patriarchal societies (Lolly Willowes, Summer Will Show, The Corner that Held Them); ambiguous sexuality, or bisexuality (Lolly Willowes, Mr Fortune's Maggot, Summer Will Show); and lyrical descriptions of landscape. Mr Fortune's Maggot, about a missionary in the Pacific Islands, has been described as a "satirical, anti-imperialist novel". In Summer Will Show, the heroine, Sophia Willoughby, travels to Paris during the 1848 Revolution and falls in love with a woman. The Corner That Held Them (1948) focuses on the lives of a community of nuns in a medieval convent.

Warner's short stories include the collections A Moral Ending and Other Stories, The Salutation, More Joy in Heaven, The Cat's Cradle Book, A Garland of Straw, The Museum of Cheats. Winter in the Air, A Spirit Rises, A Stranger with a Bag, The Innocent and the Guilty, and One Thing Leading to Another. Her final work was a collection of interconnected short stories set in the supernatural Kingdoms of Elfin. Many of these stories were published in The New Yorker. In addition to fiction, Warner wrote anti-fascist articles for such leftist publications as Time and Tide and Left Review.

After the death of the novelist T. H. White, Warner was given access to his papers. She published a biography which The New York Times declared "a small masterpiece which may well be read long after the writings of its subject have been forgotten." White's long-time friend and literary agent, David Higham, however, questioned Warner's work, suggesting a bias in her approach due to her own homosexuality: he gave Warner the address of one of White's lovers "so that she could get in touch with someone so important in Tim's story. But she never, the girl told me, took that step. So she was able to present Tim in such a light that a reviewer could call him a raging homosexual. Perhaps a heterosexual affair would have made her blush."

Warner produced several books of poetry, including Opus 7, a book-length pastoral poem about an elderly female flower-seller. The critical and personal hostility that greeted the jointly authored Whether a Dove or a Seagull in 1933 effectively put an end to the public poetic careers of both Warner and Ackland. It was only with the posthumous publication of Warner's Collected Poems in 1982 that the extent and significance of her poetry became evident, with poems ranging in date from 1914 through to 1978. Ackland's selected poems, Journey from Winter, were not published until 2008.

Although Warner never wrote an autobiography, Scenes of Childhood was compiled after her death on 1 May 1978 at the age of 84, based on short reminiscences published over the years in the New Yorker. She also translated Contre Sainte-Beuve by Marcel Proust from the original French into English.

== Legacy and commemoration ==
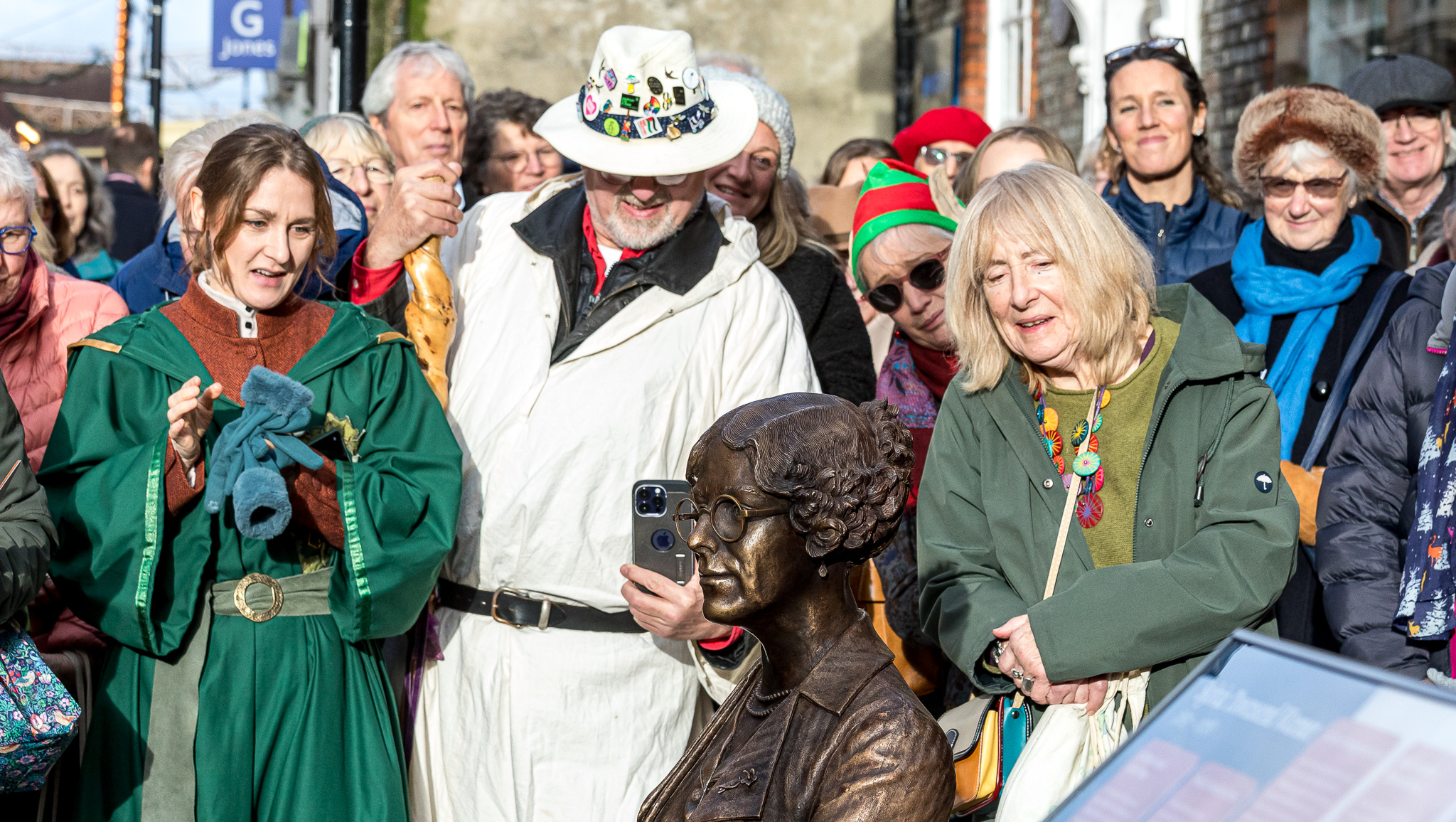
The unveiling of the Sylvia Townsend Warner's statue (with her cat) in December 2025

In the 1970s, Warner became known as a significant writer of feminist or lesbian sentiment, and her novels were among the earlier ones to be revived by Virago Press. Selected letters of Warner and Valentine Ackland have been published twice: Wendy Mulford edited a collection titled This Narrow Place in 1988, and ten years later Susanna Pinney published another selection, I’ll Stand by You.

The Sylvia Townsend Warner Society was founded in Dorchester in January 2000 and publishes The Journal of the Sylvia Townsend Warner Society annually with UCL Press.

In December 2025, a memorial to Warner was unveiled on a pedestrianised shopping street in Dorchester. The bronze statue depicts the writer sitting on a bench. The artwork was organised by the charity Visible Women UK, which campaigns for greater representation of women in public art. The choice of Warner was selected by a public vote. The sculptor Denise Dutton also created another statue in Dorset which was the Mary Anning statue in Lyme Regis. In Feb 2026 a crowd-funding campaign to raise funds to catalogue the archives of Sylvia Townsend Warner was launched byDorset Archives Trust on behalf of Dorset History Centre which now houses the author's archives on behalf of Dorset Museum and Art Gallery.

== Publications ==
=== Musicology ===
- Tudor Church Music. Edited by R. R. Terry, [E. H. Fellowes, S. T. Warner, A. Ramsbotham and P. C. Buck,] etc.

=== Novels ===
- Lolly Willowes (1926)
- Mr Fortune's Maggot (1927)
- The True Heart (1929)
- Summer Will Show (1936)
- After the Death of Don Juan (1938)
- The Corner That Held Them (1948)
- The Flint Anchor (1954) (vt The Barnards of Loseby, 1974)

=== Translations ===
- By Way of Sainte-Beuve (1958 Chatto and Windus; offset 1984 The Hogarth Press, with introduction by Terence Kilmartin) by Marcel Proust
- Proust on Art and Literature 1896–1919 (1958 Meridian Books; revised 1997 Da Capo Press, with introduction by Terence Kilmartin)

=== Non-fiction ===
- T. H. White: A Biography (1967)

=== Short stories ===
- The Maze: A Story To Be Read Aloud (1928)
- Some World Far From Ours; and Stay, Corydon, Thou Swain (1929)
- Elinor Barley (1930)
- A Moral Ending and Other Stories (1931)
- The Salutation (1932)
- More Joy in Heaven and Other Stories (1935)
- 24 Short Stories, with Graham Greene and James Laver (1939)
- The Cat's Cradle Book (1940)
- The Phoenix (1940)
- A Garland of Straw and Other Stories (1943)
- The Museum of Cheats (1947)
- Winter in the Air and Other Stories (1955)
- A Spirit Rises (1962)
- A Stranger with a Bag and Other Stories (vt. Swans on an Autumn River) (1966)
- The Innocent and the Guilty (1971)
- Kingdoms of Elfin (1977)

=== Posthumous ===
- Scenes of Childhood (1981)
- One Thing Leading to Another and Other Stories, edited by Susanna Pinney (1984)
- Selected Stories edited by Susanna Pinney and William Maxwell (1988)
- The Music at Long Verney (2001)

=== Poetry ===
- The Espalier (1925)
- Time Importuned (1928)
- Opus 7 (1931)
- Whether a Dove or Seagull (1933) (jointly with Valentine Ackland)
- Boxwood (1957) (collaboration with wood engraver Reynolds Stone)
- Collected Poems (1982)
- Selected Poems (Carcanet Press, 1985)
- New Collected Poems (Carcanet Press, 2008)

See also

- Ackland, Valentine, Journey from Winter: Selected Poems (Carcanet Press, 2008)
- Steinman, Michael, The Element of Lavishness: Letters of Sylvia Townsend Warner and William Maxwell (Counterpoint, 2001)
