= Sophie d'Arbouville =

French poet & writer (1810–1850)

Sophie de Bezancourt Loyré d'Arbouville, the Countess d'Arbouville (29 October 1810 – 22 March 1850) was a French writer.

== Biography ==
=== Early life ===
Born on October 28, 1810, Sophie de Bezancourt was the daughter of Jean Baptiste Maximilien Joseph Antoine Lecat, baron de Bazancourt, and his wife Élisabeth Marie Constance Henriette d'Houdetot. Bezancourts paternal grandparents were Joseph-François Le Cat, lord of Molagny and Bazancourt and Angélique Félicité de Rémy. Her maternal grand-parents were the saloniere Sophie d'Houdetot née Lalive de Bellegarde and César Louis d'Houdetot, colonel of the cavalry. One of her maternal uncles was the French politician, Frédéric-Christophe d'Houdetot.

Adolphe d'Houdetot, Bezancourt´s uncle as well as her aunt Césarine d'Houdetot, her mother´s younger sister was a writer. Her aunt was also married to Amable Guillaume Prosper Brugière, baron de Barante, politician and writer. Therefore its safe to assume Bezancourt grew up within a milieu that encouraged her own writing pursuits.

Léon Séché described her as follows: "She had a rather ugly figure, with strong features and protruding eyes which, at first glance, were not in her favor, but as soon as she opened her mouth, her relative ugliness was forgotten". And Sainte-Beuve said of her: "Charming young woman, a little Diane, childless. Remained a child and younger than her age. Not pretty, but better."

== Marriage ==
At the age of 22, Bezancourt married the general François Aimé Frédéric Loyré d'Arbouville. Arbouville then accompanied him on his campaigns until her health worsened and she was forced to remain in Paris.

== Death ==
Arbouville died on 22 March 1850 in Paris. after a long illness. She was buried three days later in the Montmartre cemetery

== Works ==
- (translated by Lady Mary Fox) Mary Madeleine (1851)
- Three Tales: Christine van Amberg, Resignation, and the Village Doctor (1853)
- Poésies et Nouvelles (1855)
