= Salthouse =

Village in Norfolk, England

Coordinates: 52.95°N 1.09°E

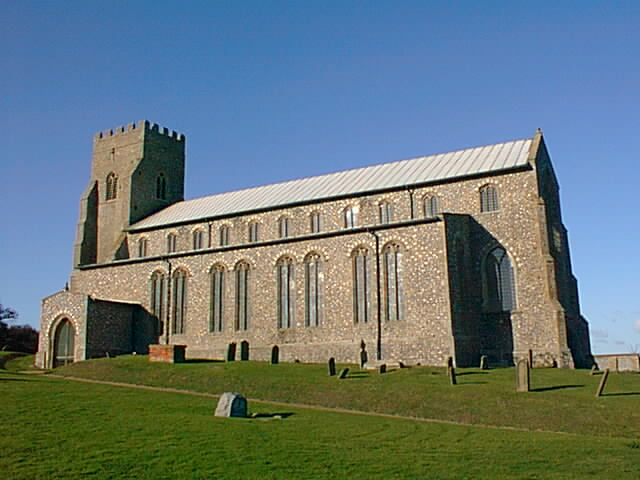
- The Parish Church of St Nicholas, Salthouse

- Location within Norfolk
- Area: 6.22 km^{2} (2.40 sq mi)
- Population: 201 (2011 census)
  - Density: 32/km^{2} (83/sq mi)
- OS grid reference: TG075439
  - London: 131
- Civil parish: Salthouse
- District: North Norfolk
- Shire county: Norfolk
- Region: East
- Country: England
- Sovereign state: United Kingdom
- Post town: HOLT
- Postcode district: NR25
- Dialling code: 01263
- Police: Norfolk
- Fire: Norfolk
- Ambulance: East of England
- UK Parliament: North Norfolk

Salthouse is a village and a civil parish in the English county of Norfolk. It is situated on the salt marshes of North Norfolk. It is 3.8 miles (6.1 km) north of Holt, 5.4 miles (8.7 km) west of Sheringham and 26.3 miles (42.3 km) north of Norwich. The village is on the A149 coast road between King's Lynn and Great Yarmouth. The nearest railway station is at Sheringham for the Bittern Line which runs between Sheringham, Cromer and Norwich. The nearest airport is Norwich International Airport. The landscape around Salthouse lies within the Norfolk Coast AONB (Area of Outstanding Natural Beauty) and the North Norfolk Heritage Coast. The civil parish has an area of 6.22 km^{2} (2.40 sq mi) and in 2001 had a population of 196 in 88 households, the population increasing to 201 at the 2011 Census. For the purposes of local government, the parish falls within the district of North Norfolk.

Changes in governmental policy have discontinued management of coastal erosion in North Norfolk.

The Parish Church of St Nicholas is a Grade I listed building; it was rebuilt by Sir Henry Heydon (died 1504). From 2001 to 2011 the church in Salthouse was the setting for an annual month-long contemporary art exhibition by artists with a Norfolk connection. The exhibition was organised by the North Norfolk Exhibition Project (NNEP). The curator of Salthouse 09 was Simon Martin from Pallant House Gallery in Chichester, on a theme of 'Salt of the Earth.' The exhibition ran from 2 July to 2 August 2009 and included ceramics, film, installation, painting, printmaking and sculpture. The 50 artists in the exhibition included Maggi Hambling, Gary Breeze, Kabir Hussain, Colin Self, Margaret Mellis and Ana Maria Pacheco and the potters Ruthanne Tudball and Stephen Parry.

The Salthouse Sculpture Trail features a number of local artist's sculptures over approximately ten miles, linking Salthouse Church and Heath, Holt town, Holt Country Park, Kelling Heath Holiday Park and Kelling Heath.

== Origins ==
The name of the village comes from the once valuable commodity of salt. It was once what it says it was: a “House for the storing of salt” and the Domesday Book of 1086 describes it so. Norfolk and Lincolnshire had more salt pans than any other counties of Medieval Britain. To produce salt seawater was boiled in clay vessels with the salt formed after the process fashioned into blocks of a standard weight and measure. Much evidence of this activity can be found along this stretch of the coast. There is evidence of even earlier settlements around Salthouse. During the construction of the village hall in 1954 a drinking vessel or beaker was dug up which dated from the Neolithic period around 2000 BC along with the fossilised vertebrae of a whale. Evidence has also been found of a Neolithic Causewayed enclosure. The earthwork is approximately circular, with a diameter of 60 metres. The circuit appears to be divided into at least seven separate lengths of ditch, although there is a larger gap to the north where a further two stretches of ditch may be obscured. The enclosure lies on a south-facing slope 50 metres above sea level on Salthouse Heath. The way in which this enclosure was used is not fully understood, but it may have been a meeting point for small, dispersed groups of people living in the surrounding area, a place where the exchange of goods, ritual feasting and other ceremonial activities might have taken place. There was also evidence uncovered of Bronze Age activity also. The tumuli at near-by Three Halfpenny and Three Farthing hills yielded brown clay urns, burnt bones and other relics in 1850 excavations. On Gramborough Hill evidence has been uncovered of a substantial Roman building believed to have been a fort with a settlement which was occupied between the early 3rd century until the middle of the 4th century.

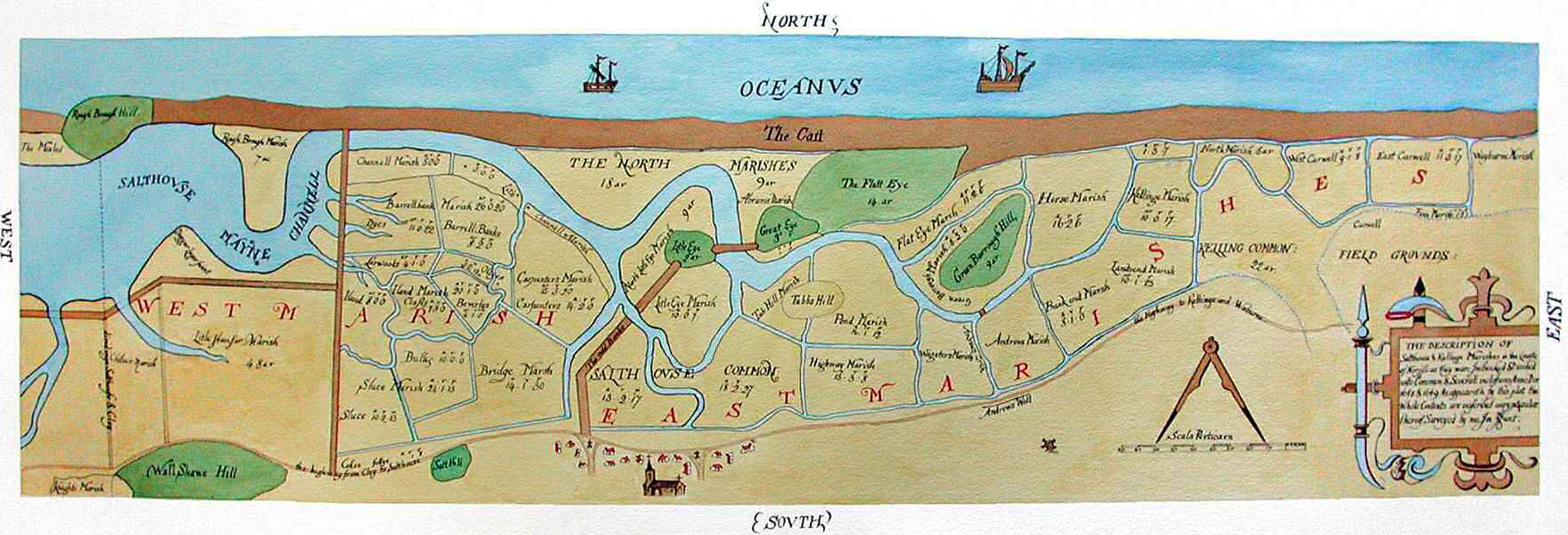
Map of Saltmarsh 1649

== Salthouse Marshes ==
66 hectares of coastal grazing marsh and saline lagoons are managed as a nature reserve by the Norfolk Wildlife Trust. Lying between Walsey Hills and Kelling Hard, the marshes are of international importance for wildlife, particularly birds. The remains of WWII pillboxes remain on the two high points either side of the beach car park.

Randall's Folly, a Victorian building on a mound in the marshes, was badly damaged in the North Sea flood of 1953, resulting in its subsequent demolition.

== Salthouse Heath ==
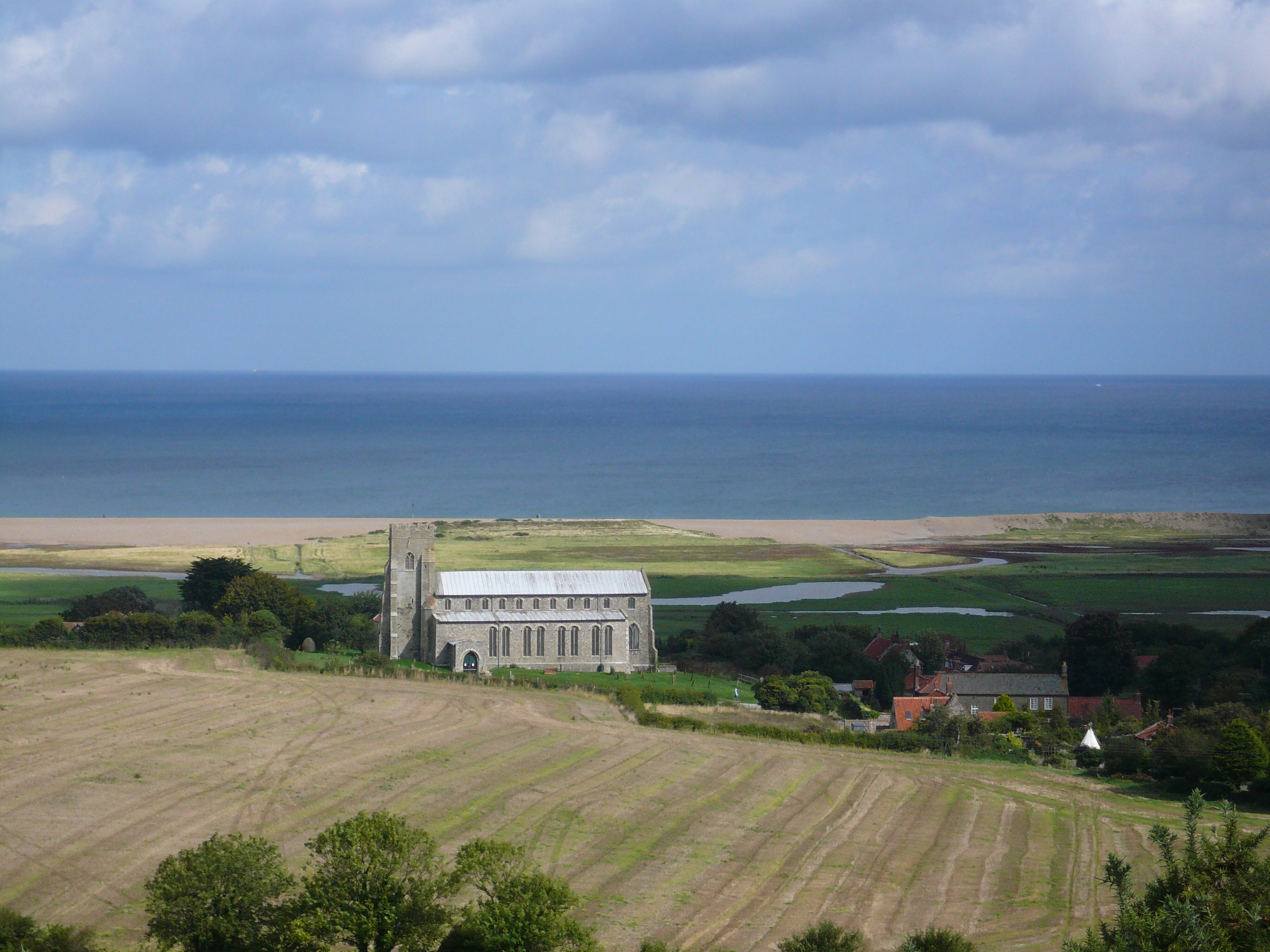
View of Salthouse Church from the heath

Forming part of the Cromer Ridge of glacial moraine, the heath is an important wildlife site and also has the largest cluster of Bronze Age burial mounds in Norfolk. The predominant vegetation is gorse and heather, but in recent years the open aspect of the southern part has been lost by encroaching birch and oak woodland. It is known locally as a good place to hear nightingales and nightjars in early summer. Salthouse Heath has the remains of a number of WWII structures and defences.

== Gallery ==
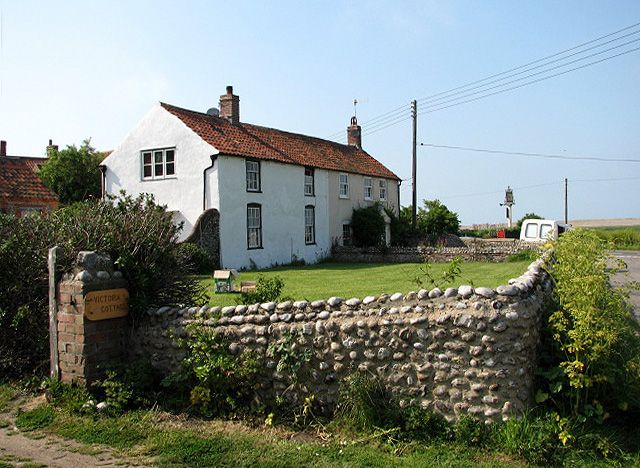
Cottages by the green

Salthouse marsh in winter

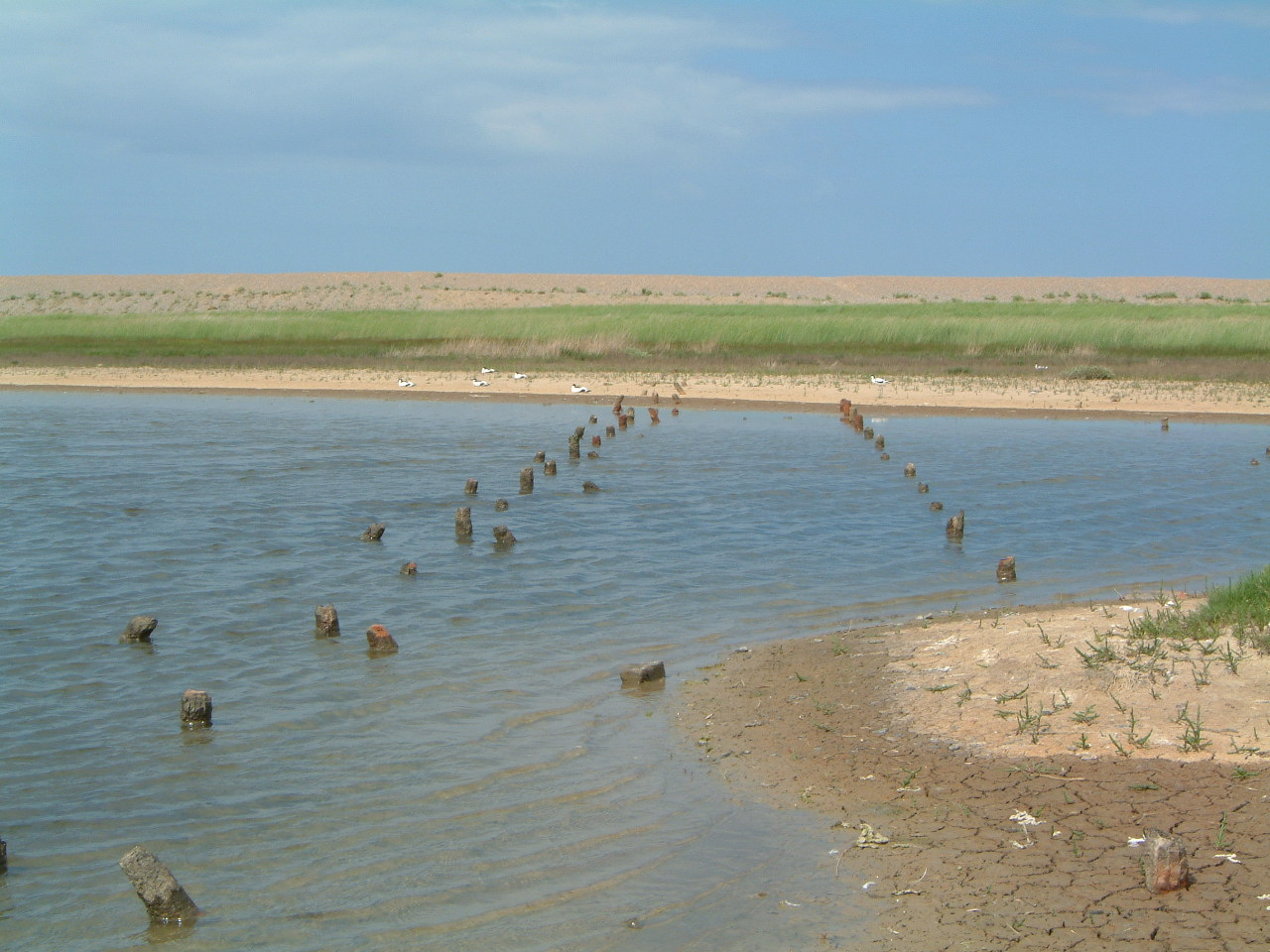
Remains of WWII anti-tank defence on Salthouse marsh
