= Kelling Heath Holiday Park =

Holiday camp in Norfolk, England

Coordinates: 52°55′45″N 1°08′13″E

Kelling Heath Holiday Park is a holiday park in Norfolk, England, owned and operated by Blue Sky Leisure. Kelling Heath Holiday Park is located on the North Norfolk coastline between the market towns of Sheringham and Holt. The holiday park got its name from the surrounding area, Kelling Heath, which is recognised as an Area of Outstanding Natural Beauty.

== History ==
The Kelling Heath Holiday Park site was purchased by the Timewell family following a period of prolonged negotiations.

Originally opened on 6 April 1984, the park's opening had been rushed to ensure that it could benefit from the popular Easter holiday period, which turned out to be the hottest Easter for years. Over the next few years significant refurbishments were carried out on the site's facilities, including extensive work on its electrical system, as well as its shower, WC and laundry blocks.

Just after the 1991 May Day weekend the entire park had to be evacuated when two drums containing toxic chemicals washed up on the nearby Weybourne beach.

In 1999 Kelling Heath began its red squirrel breeding programme, which was part of a national initiative to re-introduce these animals into the British eco-system. The program has proven to be a success and the animal can be found throughout the Kelling Heath park. In 2013 the park announced that for the first time it has two breeding pairs of red squirrels, which resulted in two baby red squirrels being born in the park and that were named Sunny and Summer.

== Accommodation and Facilities ==
There are a number of accommodation options at the park, from camping pitches to luxury holiday homes. Onsite facilities include restaurants, a bike hire, swimming pool and shower/WC blocks.

== Environmental Impact ==
Kelling Heath has become noted for its positive impact on the local environment. The holiday park has introduced a number of environmentally-friendly practices, most notably its successful red squirrel breeding programme. The company has also invested £180,000 in harnessing the power of solar energy.

The holiday park is located within a Site of Special Scientific Interest and as a result it has become known for its commitment to managing its rare habitat. Many of the park's accommodations are set amongst its woodland environment and the structure of its permanent buildings are sympathetic to its environment.

In 2014 the park's environmental credentials were further heightened when it became the location for the popular BBC2 programme, Stargazing Live. This programme highlighted the park's prime position for astronomy enthusiasts and the fact that it is located away from major cities means that it provides the darkness needed for stargazing.

== Train Station ==
Kelling Heath is one of the only holiday parks in the UK to have its own train station, Kelling Heath Halt railway station. The station is part of the North Norfolk Railway, which is a 10.5 mile round trip and connects Sheringham with Holt.

== Recognition ==
Kelling Heath Holiday Park won the 2013 Caravan Holiday Park/Holiday Village of the Year at the Visit England Awards of Excellence.

The park was subsequently featured and reviewed in The Daily Telegraph and the Daily Mirror.
