= West Ringstead =

Deserted medieval village in Dorset, England

- Deserted village
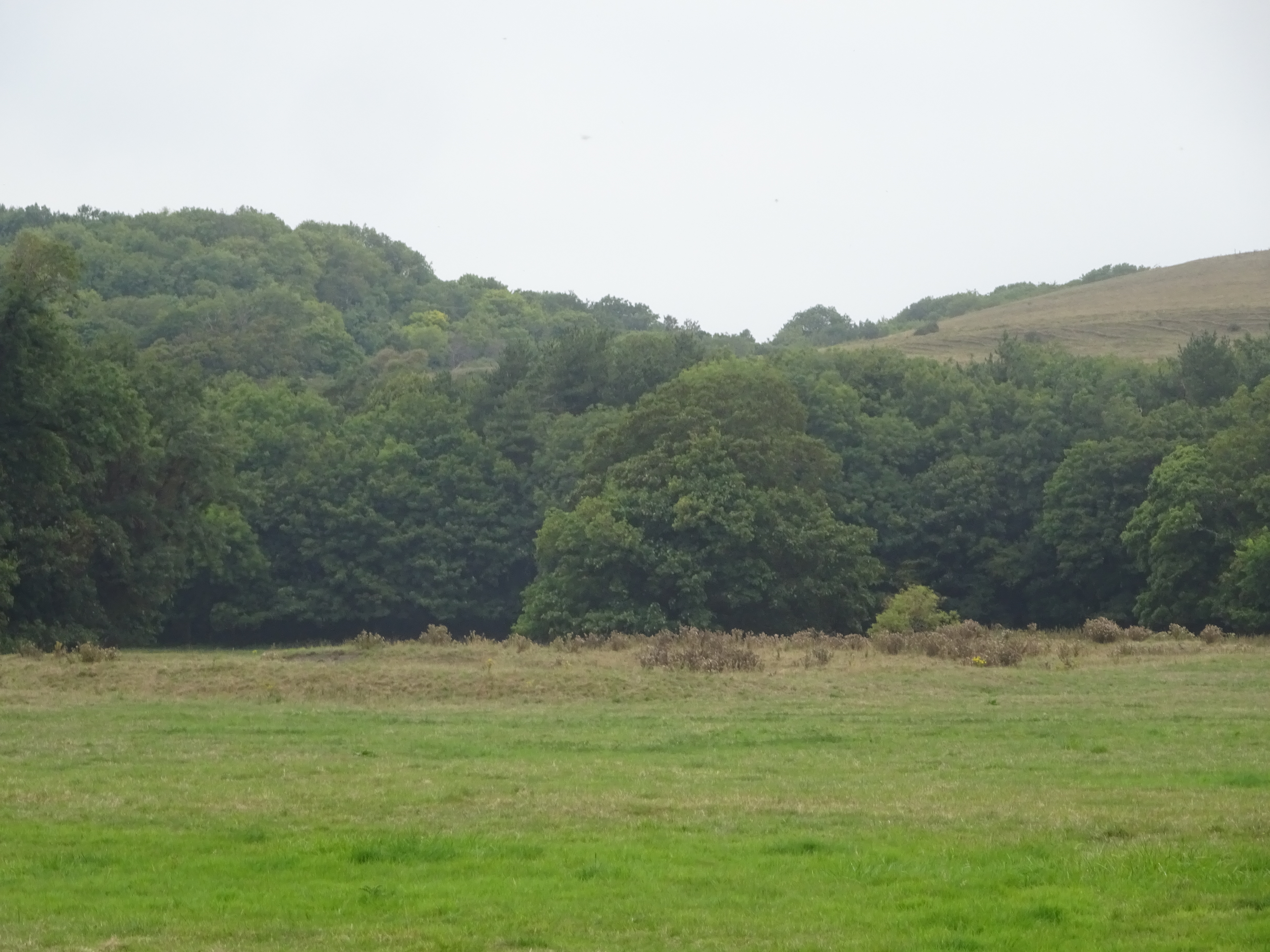
- The field where West Ringstead is located from the South West Coast Path

- Location within Dorset
- Coordinates: 50.63361°N 2.35868°W
- Ordnance Survey: Map sources for West Ringstead
- Country: England, United Kingdom
- County: Dorset

West Ringstead is a deserted medieval village located on the coast in Dorset, southern England. The village lies on the Jurassic Coast and is located west of the modern village of Ringstead.

This medieval village with a church is located in a field to the west of the current Ringstead settlement. It is mentioned in the Domesday Book. It was most likely abandoned after the arrival of the Black Death at Weymouth in 1348. All that can be seen now are variations in the ground level. The site is listed on the National Heritage List for England as a Scheduled Monument (no. 1019393), listed on 15 January 1960.

What remains of the village church now forms part of Glebe Cottage, immediately north of the main village site. It has walls consisting of local rubble and the roof covered with modern tiles. Only the chancel and its arch survive from the original medieval church building.

The village site is in the parish of Osmington. There was a separate parish of Ringstead until at least the late 15th century. There are four different Ringsteads listed in the Domesday Book, each apparently a separate settlement. One was later given the name "West Ringstead". Another, later known as "Up Ringstead", may have been at the site of the present Upton House to the east above Ringstead Bay towards White Nothe. The location of "Middle Ringstead" is not known. The name of "East Ringstead" survived as a field name on an 1829 Tithe Map in the east of the parish.

The location of West Ringstead is just inland from the South West Coast Path. To the east are Ringstead Bay and the headland of White Nothe. To the west are Bran Point and the village of Osmington Mills.

== See also ==
- Ringstead, modern village
- RAF Ringstead, radar station
