= Owermoigne =

Village and civil parish in Dorset, England

Coordinates: 50.6669°N 2.3289°W

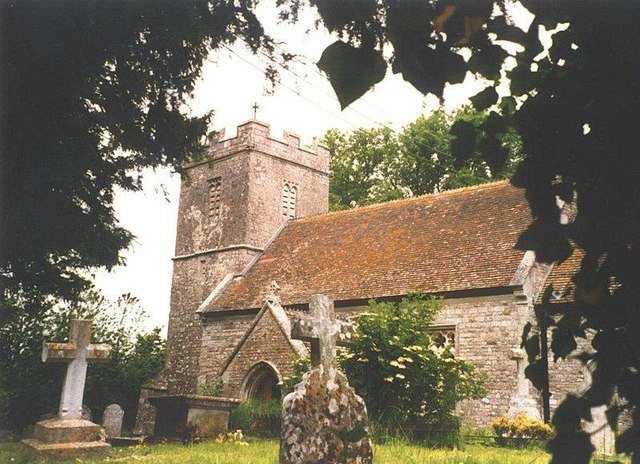
- Parish church of St Michael

- Location within Dorset
- Population: 467
- OS grid reference: SY768853
- Unitary authority: Dorset
- Ceremonial county: Dorset
- Region: South West
- Country: England
- Sovereign state: United Kingdom
- Post town: Dorchester
- Postcode district: DT2
- Police: Dorset
- Fire: Dorset and Wiltshire
- Ambulance: South Western
- UK Parliament: South Dorset

Owermoigne (/ˌoʊ.ərˈmɔɪn/ OH-ər-MOYN) is a village and civil parish in the county of Dorset in southern England, situated 6 miles (9.7 km) south-east of Dorchester. In the 2011 census the parish had a population of 467. The parish is within an electoral ward with the same name, which stretches from the east side of the small coastal village of Ringstead north towards Owermoigne and then up to, but not including, Crossways. To the east it covers White Nothe, Holworth and Galton. The population of this ward at the 2011 census was 3,804.

The parish was formerly part of the hundred of Winfrith, and subsequently constituted a liberty by itself.

Owermoigne village is described as Nether Moynton in the fictional Wessex of Thomas Hardy's novels and his short story The Distracted Preacher in Wessex Tales takes place in the village.

At Holworth is a small wooden church dedicated to St Catherine-by-the-Sea above Burning Cliff.
