= Perry Ledge =

Coordinates: 50.6308°N 2.3618°W

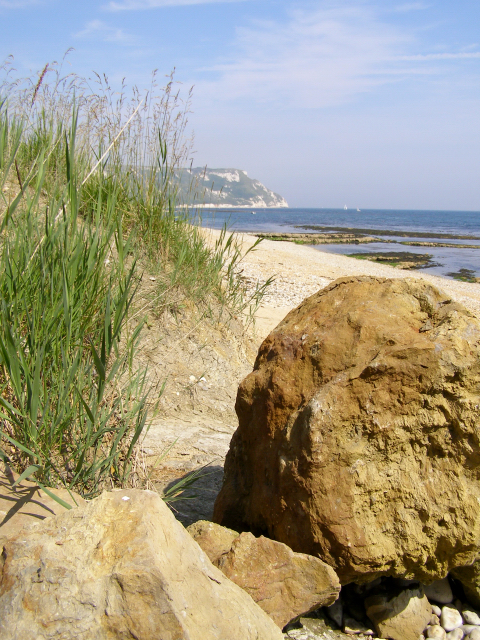
The beach at Perry Ledge, west of Ringstead, Dorset. In the foreground are sandstone boulders that have fallen from the cliffs at Bran Point. Beyond is the stony beach and Perry Ledge, with the White Nothe headland in the distance.

Perry Ledge is a reef west of Ringstead in Dorset, England.

The ledge consists of limestone dating from the Jurassic period and is exposed at low tide. It is located close to Bran Point.
