= Burning Cliff =

Cliff in Dorset, England

- Cliff
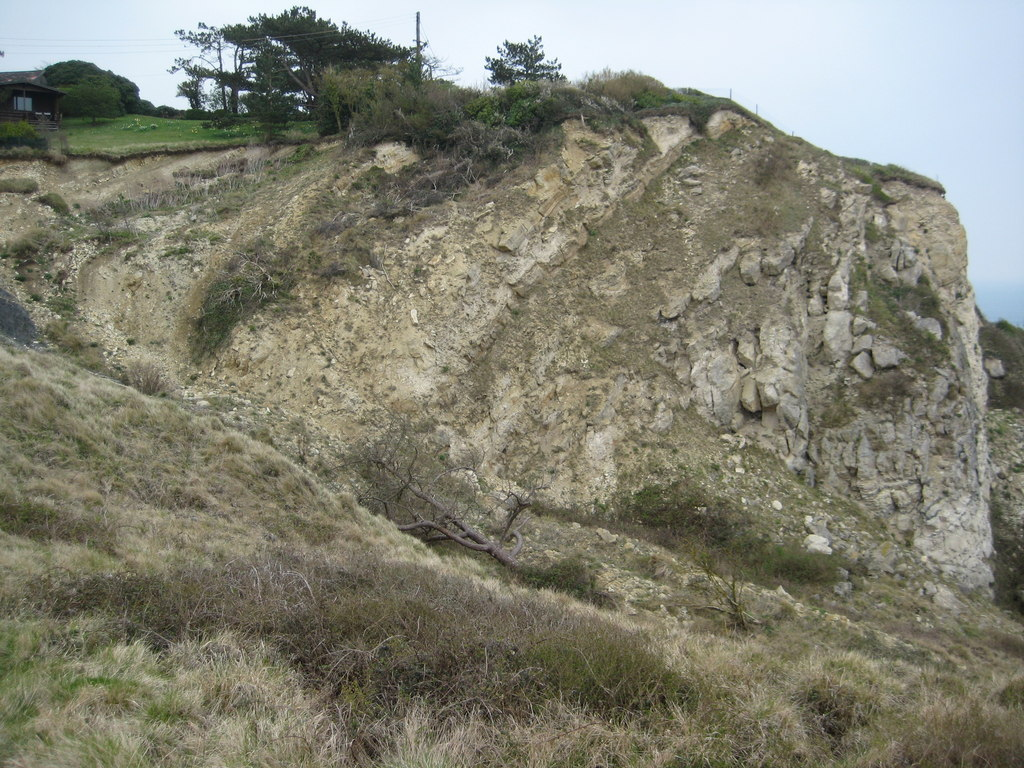
- View of the cliff

- Location within Dorset
- Coordinates: 50.63320160°N 2.34103861°W
- Grid position: SY762815
- Location: Dorset, England
- Highest elevation: 31.1m

Burning Cliff is a cliff under the White Nothe headland at the eastern end of Ringstead Bay, in Dorset, England. The area is well known for its geology and fossils.

The cliff is to the northwest of White Nothe. From 1826, the cliff smouldered with an underground fire for several years due to bituminous shale, hence the name.

Geologically, Burning Cliff is on a Kimmeridge Clay outcrop. It is immediately west of the fault and Holworth House. The cliff was originally named Holworth Cliff. Today, the cliff consists of landslide, scrubland plants, with the Kimmeridge Clay partially visible. The Kimmeridge Clay above a fault connecting it with the Purbeck Formation to the east under Holworth House. There is a footpath on the cliff.

The 1826 fire in the bituminous shale continued for several years. The fire is thought to have been started by heat caused by decomposing pyrite, common in bituminous shale. It emitted sulphurous fumes.

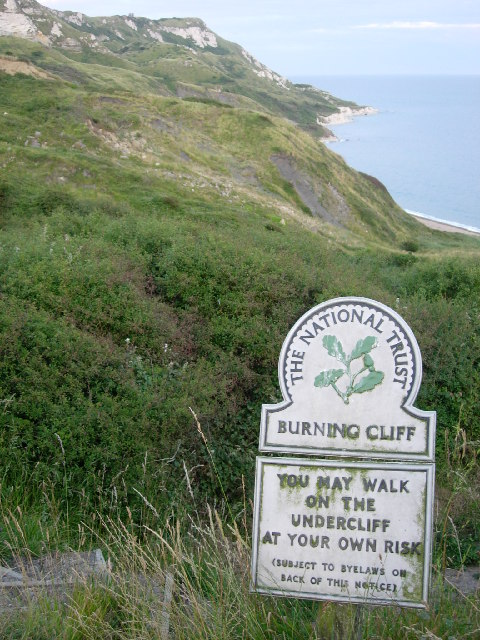
National Trust sign for the Burning Cliff, with White Nothe in the distance

At the top of the cliff is a Church of England church, St Catherine-by-the-Sea, Holworth. The cliff lies on the South West Coast Path and forms part of the Jurassic Coast World Heritage Site. The surrounding area is owned by the National Trust.

== See also ==
- Geology of Dorset
- Jurassic Coast
- Ringstead Bay
- White Nothe
