= Ringstead, Dorset =

Coastal village in Dorset, England

Ringstead
- Village
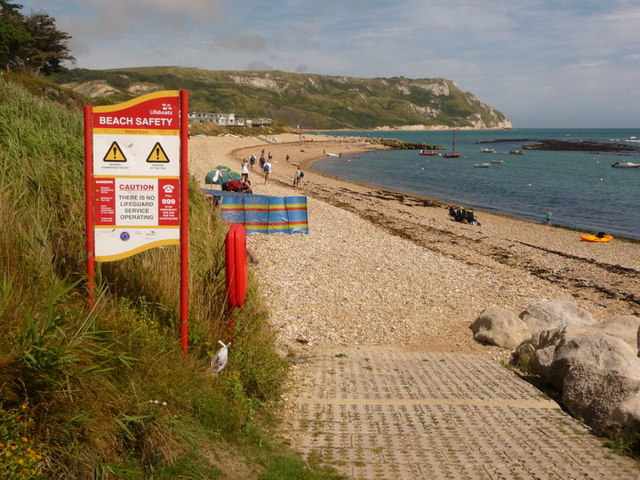
- Looking east on the beach at Ringstead with White Nothe in the background

- Location within Dorset
- Coordinates: 50.63197°N 2.35465°W
- Ordnance Survey: Map sources for Ringstead, Dorset
- Country: England, United Kingdom
- County: Dorset

Ringstead is a small seaside village located on the coast in Dorset, southern England. The area lies on the Jurassic Coast and is known for its natural environment and fossils. Ringstead Bay and White Nothe are to the east. Bran Point and Osmington Mills are to the west.

== Beach ==
Ringstead has a pebble and shingle beach with some sand at the western end of Ringstead Bay. There are offshore reefs approximately 0.6 kilometres (0.37 mi) in length opposite the beach at Ringstead that are uncovered at low tide. These form an intertidal zone between the low cliffs to the north and the English Channel to the south.

== West Ringstead ==
The original medieval village and church at Ringstead, located in a field to the west of the current settlement and mentioned in the Domesday Book, no longer exists. It was most likely abandoned after the arrival of the Black Death at Weymouth in 1348. All that can be seen now are variations in the ground level. The site is listed on the National Heritage List for England.

== Modern Ringstead ==
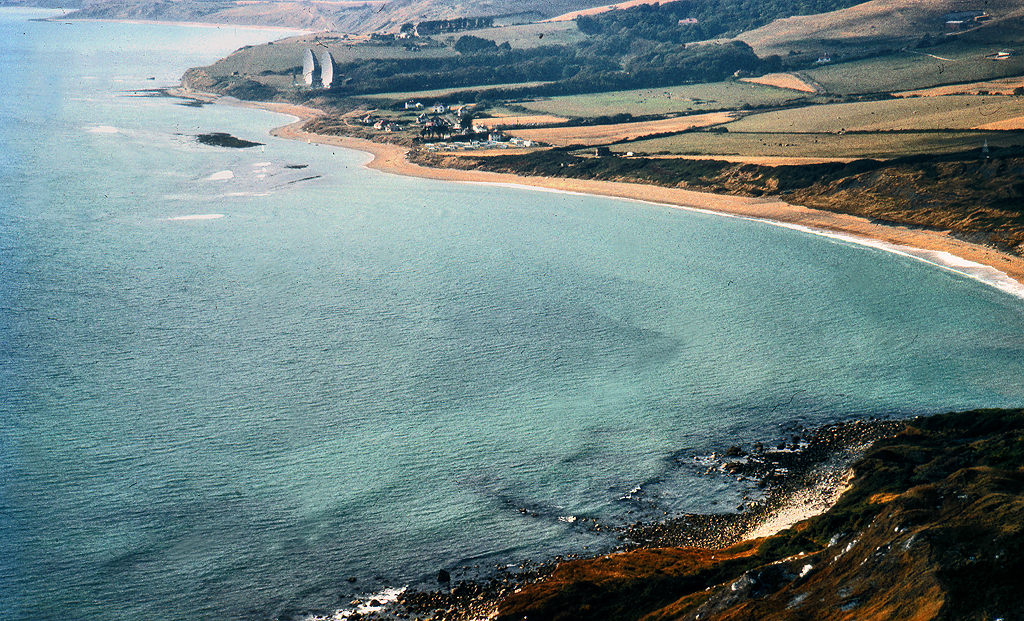
1970 view of West Ringstead from White Nothe, with Ringstead Bay in the foreground and the two radar masts of RAF Ringsteadin the distance

The modern village of Ringstead is located to the west of the original abandoned village, with a few former fishermen's cottages and holiday homes. The beach, although mostly shingle, is popular with holidaymakers. During World War II and the Cold War, a radar station, known as RAF Ringstead, was located at Ringstead.

== Location ==
Immediately to the east are Ringstead Bay, Burning Cliff, and beyond that the white chalk cliffs of White Nothe, dominating the view. It is possible to walk to the top of White Nothe and back from the village, with views of the bay and across to the Isle of Portland. It is also possible to walk to Ringstead Bay on a circular walk from Lulworth Cove to the east, via Durdle Door and White Nothe.

The small village of Osmington Mills lies on the coast about 1.5 kilometres (0.93 mi) to the west and there is a footpath along the cliffs, via Bran Point. Perry Ledge is a reef off the beach near Bran Point. The large town of Weymouth is situated approximately 8 kilometres (5 mi) west of Ringstead Bay.

Ringstead also has a nudist beach that is a 20-minutes walk east of the main beach.

== Access ==
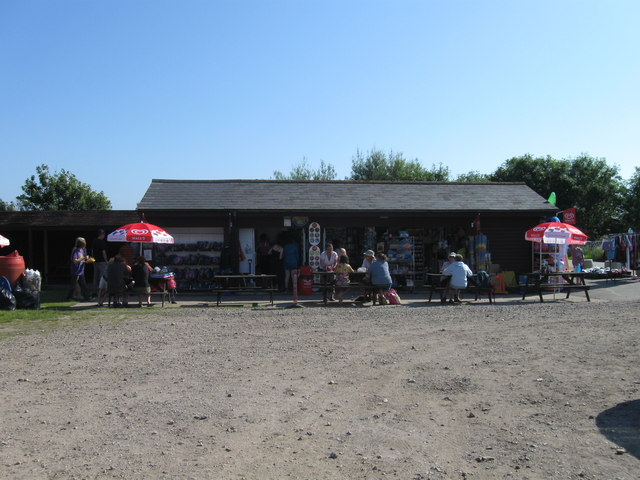
The beach cafe next to the car park at Ringstead

Ringstead is accessible by way of a private road with a car park and shop/cafe at the end near the sea just before the village itself. There is an alternative free car park in the National Trust area further inland, with footpath access to the sea via a 15–20 minute walk.

== See also ==
- Ringstead Bay
- RAF Ringstead
