= St John's Church, Poxwell =

Church in Dorset, England

St John's Church
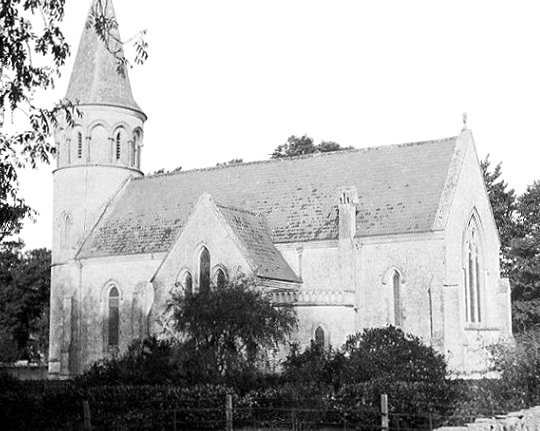

Religion
- Affiliation: Church of England
- Ecclesiastical or organizational status: Demolished
- Year consecrated: 1868

Location
- Location: Poxwell, Dorset, England
- Interactive map of St John's Church
- Coordinates: 50.6555°N 2.3663°W

Architecture
- Architect: George Evans
- Type: Church
- Style: Early English

St John's Church was a Church of England church in Poxwell, Dorset, England. It was built in 1867–68 as a replacement to an earlier church and was demolished in 1969.

== History ==
St John's was built in 1867–68 as the replacement of an earlier church which was described in the Post Office Directory as being a "small ancient fabric" with a nave and chancel but no tower. It was demolished in 1866, prior to the construction of the new church approximately 70 yards eastwards.

The new church, also dedicated to St John the Evangelist, was built at the sole expense of John Trenchard Trenchard, the patron of the living and owner of the Poxwell and Ringstead estates. It was designed by Mr. George Evans of Wimborne Minster and built by Mr. R. Reynolds of Wimborne Minster. The carving work was carried out by Mr. Grassby of Dorchester.

St John's was consecrated on 22 April 1868 by the Bishop of Sodor and Man, the Right Rev. Horatio Powys, on behalf of the Bishop of Salisbury (the Right Rev. Walter Kerr Hamilton), who was unable to consecrate the church due to illness.

The church was demolished in 1969, following the union of the parishes of Osmington and Poxwell. A survey of the spire concluded it was unsafe and required repairs at an estimated cost of £5,000, which was beyond the financial means of the village's 50 inhabitants. It was decided to demolish the church, with work beginning on 11 August 1969. Despite the survey's claims, the spire was much stronger than expected and the first attempt to pull it down failed. The first set of thick steel hawsers which were wrapped around the spire snapped under the strain when they were pulled by a mechanical digger. The second attempt to fell the spire was successful after thicker hawsers were attached. The contractors received payment for their demolition work by salvaging material from the building. The churchyard remains near the site of the church.

== Architecture ==
St John's was made up of a nave, chancel with south vestry, north and south transepts, north porch, and circular west tower with spire, the latter reaching a height of 90 feet. The lower part of the tower was designed to form a small baptistery. The church's font was made of Bath stone, with the column being supported by six detached shafts of Devonshire marble.

Some of the church's fittings were transferred from the older church, including the single bell, which dated to the 15th century and was cast at Wokingham. With the church's demolition, the bell was moved to St Martin's Church at Broadmayne. Fittings taken from the earlier church included a marble tablet to Joseph Kingstone Warne, 1823, and his wife Leah, 1838, another to Roger Warne, 1831, and Martha, daughter of Joseph Kingstone and Leah Warne, 1834, another to Mary Anne, daughter of Joseph Kingstone and Leah Warne, 1846, and a fourth to the former rector George Pickard, 1840, and his wife, 1828.
