= Weymouth Bay from the Downs above Osmington Mills =

Painting by John Constable

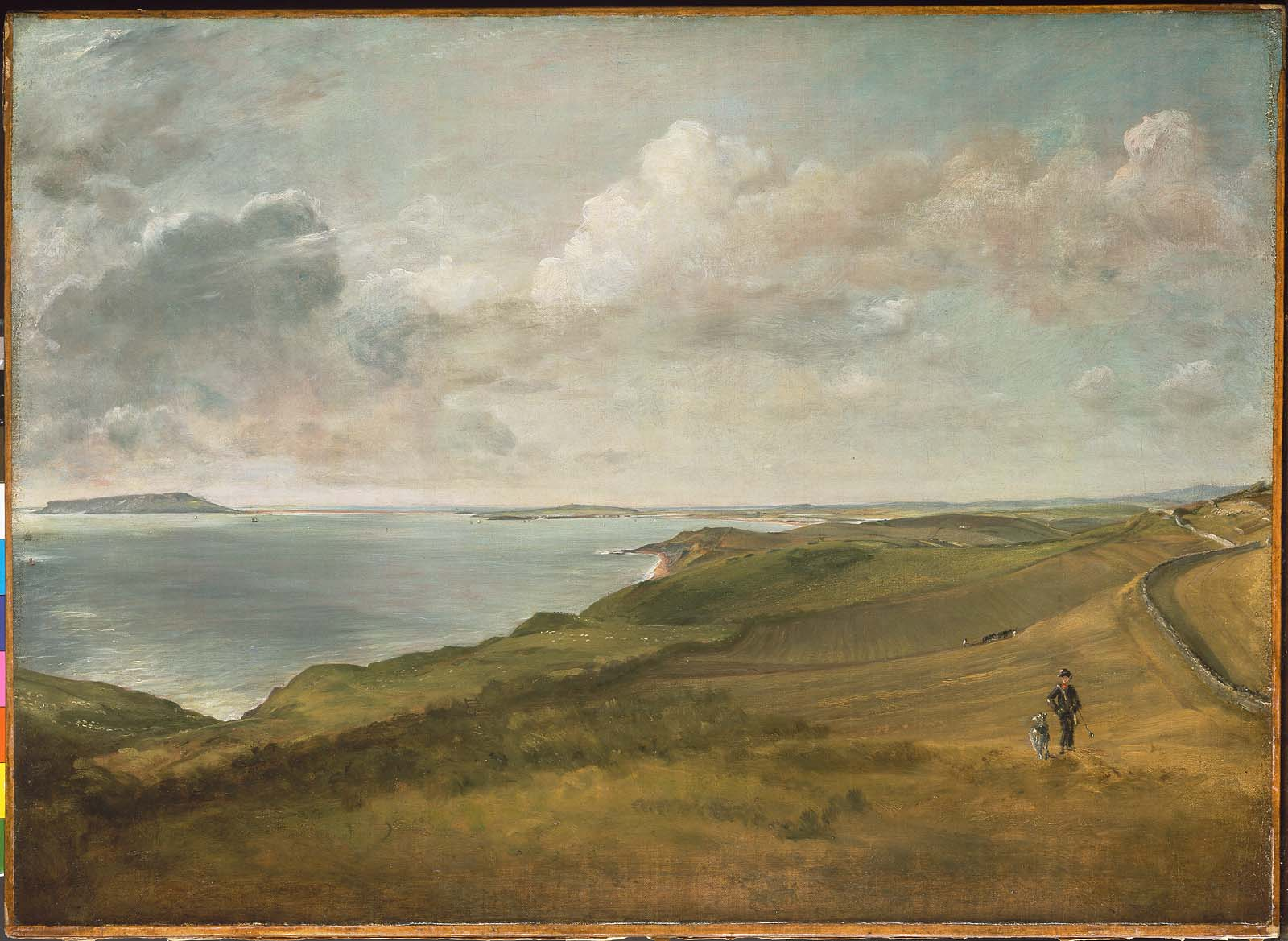
- Artist: John Constable
- Year: 1816
- Type: Oil on canvas, landscape painting
- Dimensions: 55.9 cm × 77.2 cm (22.0 in × 30.4 in)
- Location: Museum of Fine Arts; Boston

Weymouth Bay from the Downs above Osmington Mills is an 1816 landscape painting by the British artist John Constable featuring a view of the English coast in Dorset. From the Dorset Downs close to the village of Osmington Mills it looks out across Weymouth Bay by Redcliff Point. The Isle of Portland can be seen in the distance on the left. Constable had married his wife Maria in October 1816 and the couple spent a six week honeymoon at Osmington Mills. Due to the topographical accuracy, it is likely to have been produced as an outdoors oil sketch on the spot. Today the painting is in the Museum of Fine Arts in Boston, Massachusetts, having been acquired in 1930.

== See also ==
- List of paintings by John Constable

== Bibliography ==
- Bailey, Anthony. John Constable: A Kingdom of his Own. Random House, 2012.
- Charles, Victoria. Constable. Parkstone International, 2015.
- Reynolds, Graham. Constable's England. Metropolitan Museum of Art, 1983.
- Thornes, John E. John Constable's Skies: A Fusion of Art and Science. A&C Black, 1999.
