= Black Head, Dorset =

Headland in Dorset, England

Coordinates: 50.6376°N 2.3875°W

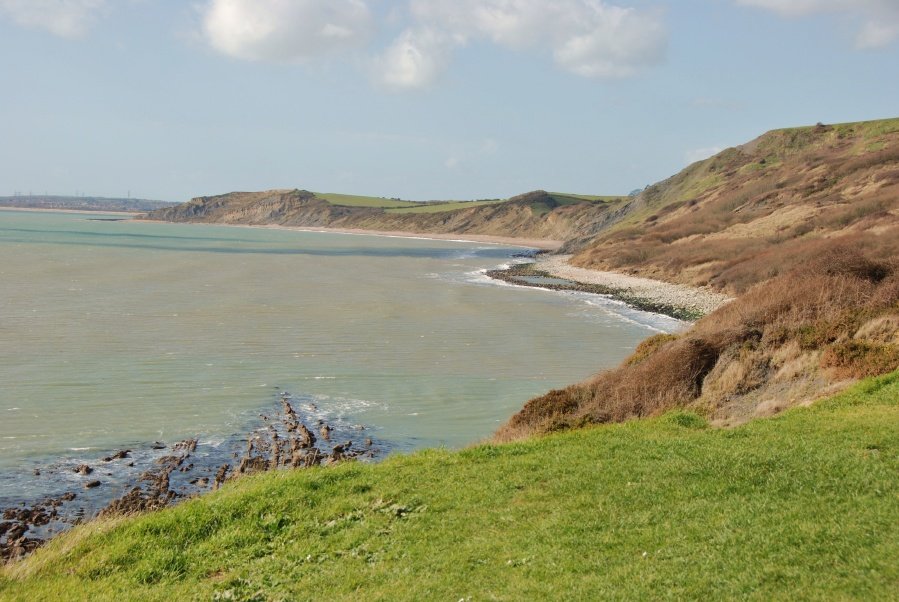
Osmington Mills- View towards Black Head

Black Head a headland on the south coast of England, to the east of Weymouth in Dorset. It lies on the Jurassic Coast, a UNESCO World Heritage landscape known for its geology. Fossils can be found in the area.

The headland faces out over to the Isle of Portland. It is so-called because of the black colouring of the cliffs at this point. To the west along the coast are Redcliff Point and Bowleaze Cove. To the east are the coastal village of Osmington Mills and beyond that Bran Point.

== See also ==
- Bran Point, known for its brown cliffs
- Redcliff Point, known for its red cliffs
- White Nothe, known for its white chalk cliffs
