= Poxwell =

Hamlet in Dorset, England

Coordinates: 50.6558°N 2.3665°W

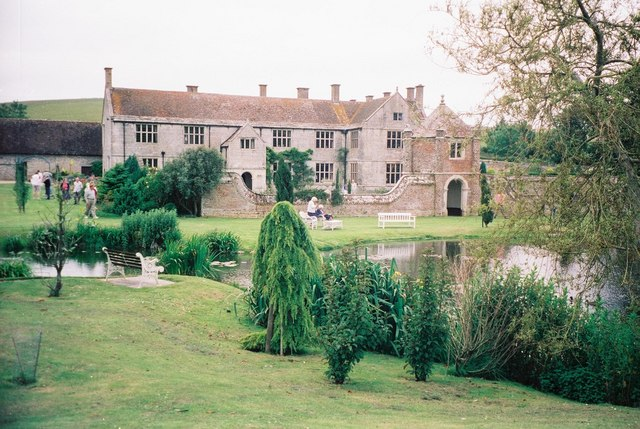
- Poxwell Manor

- Location within Dorset
- OS grid reference: SY742842
- Unitary authority: Dorset
- Ceremonial county: Dorset
- Region: South West
- Country: England
- Sovereign state: United Kingdom
- Post town: Dorchester
- Postcode district: DT2
- Police: Dorset
- Fire: Dorset and Wiltshire
- Ambulance: South Western
- UK Parliament: South Dorset

Poxwell (/ˈpoʊkswəl/; sometimes written Pokeswell) is a hamlet and civil parish in the county of Dorset in southwest England. It is located 6 miles (9.7 km) east of Weymouth. The current population of the parish is around 50.

== Sites of interest ==
The name originates from the ‘Pokes well’ – a well dating from the period when occupied by the Romans in the first century which is located on a hillside in the village. In 1989, English Heritage excavated a site nearby to this and found ruins of a settlement dating to around the same period, in which various artefacts were found. The hamlet is named Pocheswelle in the Domesday Book of 1086, located in the hundred of Winfrith.

The oldest building in the village is the tithe barn that dates from the thirteenth century, which is a Grade I listed building. It remains in very good condition and has had various uses throughout its history including: a tithe collection point, a corn mill, a stable, a hay barn and has held many church services there; in recent times they are held during the harvest festival period.

In the Middle Ages, Poxwell, or Pokeswell, was a possession of Cerne Abbey. Following the abbey's dissolution, it was granted by Queen Elizabeth to Thomas Howard of Lulworth and Bindon. Poxwell Manor was the seat of the Henning family. It was built in 1613 by Poole merchant John Henning, whose son John had been High Sheriff of Dorsetshire in 1609. In 1699, the Manor passed to Elizabeth Trenchard née Henning, the wife of Colonel Thomas Trenchard of Wolfeton (in the parish of Charminster near Dorchester). In 1727, the Trenchards resettled the Henning estates. It is understood that King George III visited the house on a number of occasions. Thomas Hardy used the Manor as Oxwell Hall in “The Trumpet Major”. The Manor remained in the Trenchard family of Lytchett Matravers and Wolverton until the 1970s. Since then, the previous owner has held many charitable functions in which one of its visitors was The Princess Royal on 14 June 1997.

There was once a small church alongside the Manor, dedicated to St John the Evangelist, that dated to around the twelfth century. This was rebuilt by John Trenchard (who built the Trenchard cottages that line the road in 1843) in 1868, only to be demolished a hundred years later in 1969, as it was too costly to maintain, and it was believed to be unsafe; however, it took two steel cables to pull the spire down.

On the edge of the village stands Cairn Circle, a small stone circle that is said to have been worshipped by the druids during pagan worship over two millennia ago. It has been dubbed "mini Stonehenge", being just fourteen feet in diameter.
