= Ringstead Coral Bed =

- Stratigraphic range: Jurassic
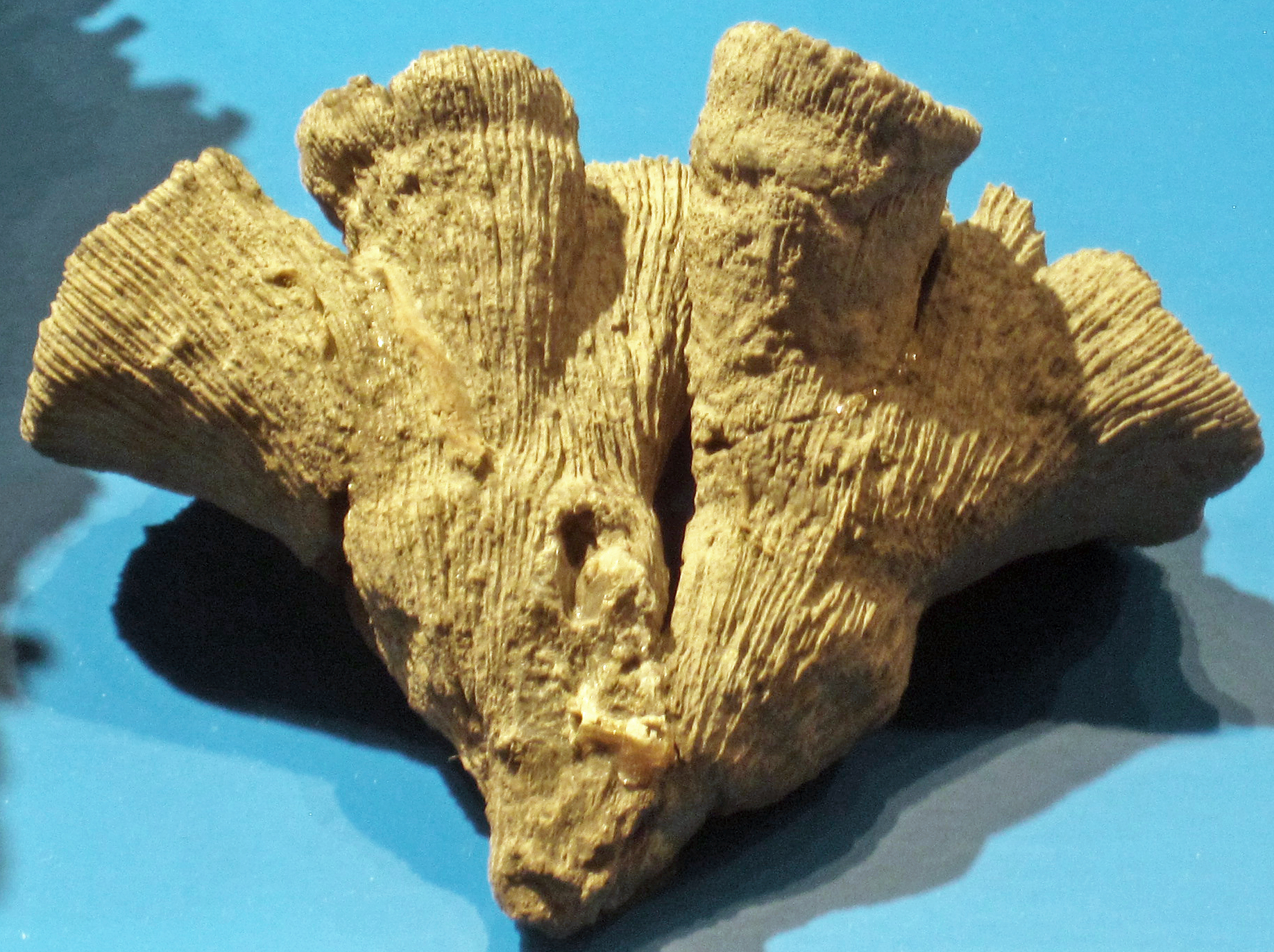
- Fossil coral from the Jurassic Coast, in the collection of the Field Museum of Natural History, Chicago, USA
- Type: Formation

Location
- Region: England
- Country: United Kingdom

The Ringstead Coral Bed (also sometimes in the plural) is a geological formation with fossilized coral in England. It preserves fossils dating back to the Jurassic period. The beds are exposed at Ringstead Bay in Dorset, on the Jurassic Coast, hence the name.

== See also ==
- List of fossiliferous stratigraphic units in England
- Jurassic Coast
- Ringstead Bay
