= Broadrock =

Coordinates: 50.6354°N 2.4129°W

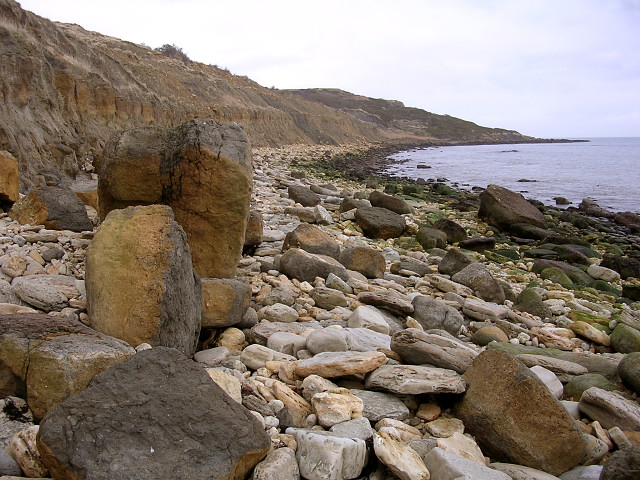
Broadrock, looking towards Redcliff Point.

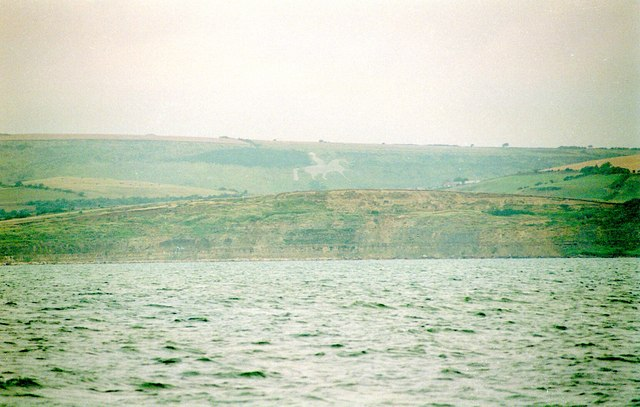
View from the sea of the Corallian cliffs at Broadrock, with the Osmington White Horse in the background.

Broadrock is a cliff on the coast in Dorset, southern England. It faces out into Weymouth Bay between Bowleaze Cove and Redcliff Point. There are many landslips on the cliffs at this point.

== See also ==
- Corallian Limestone
