= Redcliff Point =

UNESCO World Heritage landscape in England

Coordinates: 50.6333°N 2.4089°W

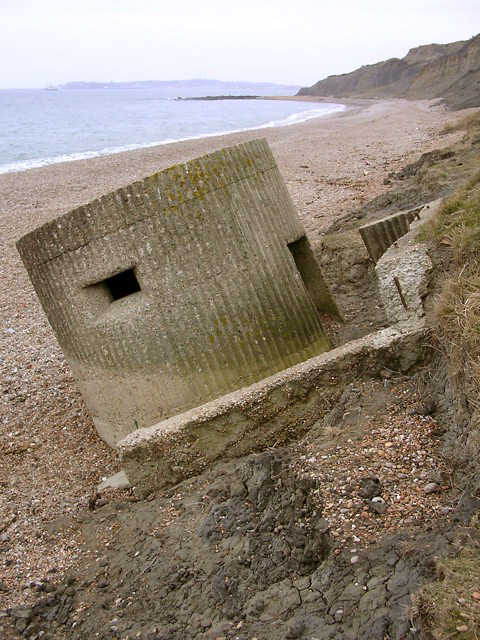
Redcliff Point from the east with a World War II pillbox in the foreground.

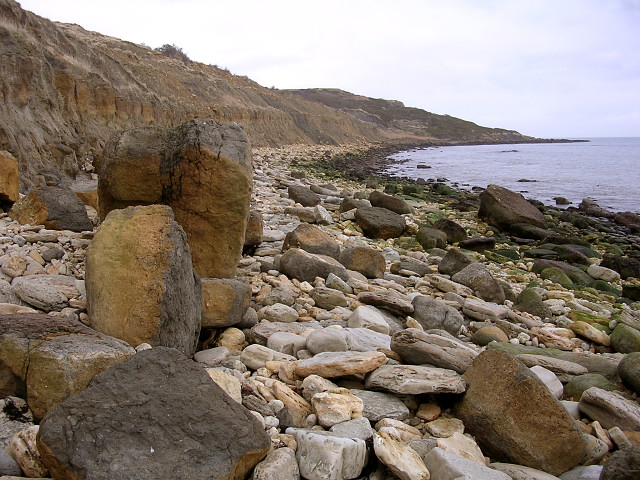
View of Redcliff Point from Broadrock.

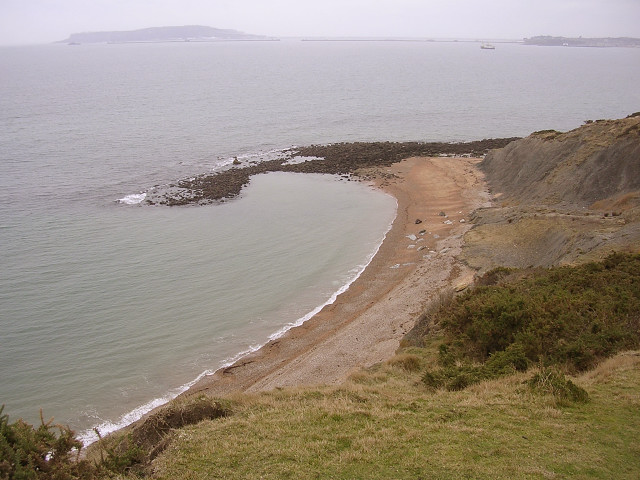
View of Redcliff Point with Weymouth Bay and the Isle of Portland in the background.

Redcliff Point is on the south coast of England, to the east of Weymouth in Dorset. It lies just past the eastern end of the sweeping Weymouth Bay on the Jurassic Coast, a UNESCO World Heritage landscape known for its geology. Fossils can be found in the Upper Oxford Clay in this area.

The cliff looks over to the Isle of Portland. It is so-called because of the red colouring of the cliffs at this point.

Close by to the west are the Broadrock cliffs and Bowleaze Cove. To the east are Black Head and the coastal village of Osmington Mills.

== See also ==
- Bran Point, known for its brown cliffs
- White Nothe, known for its white chalk cliffs
