= St Catherine-by-the-Sea, Holworth =

Church in Dorset, England

St Catherine-by-the-Sea
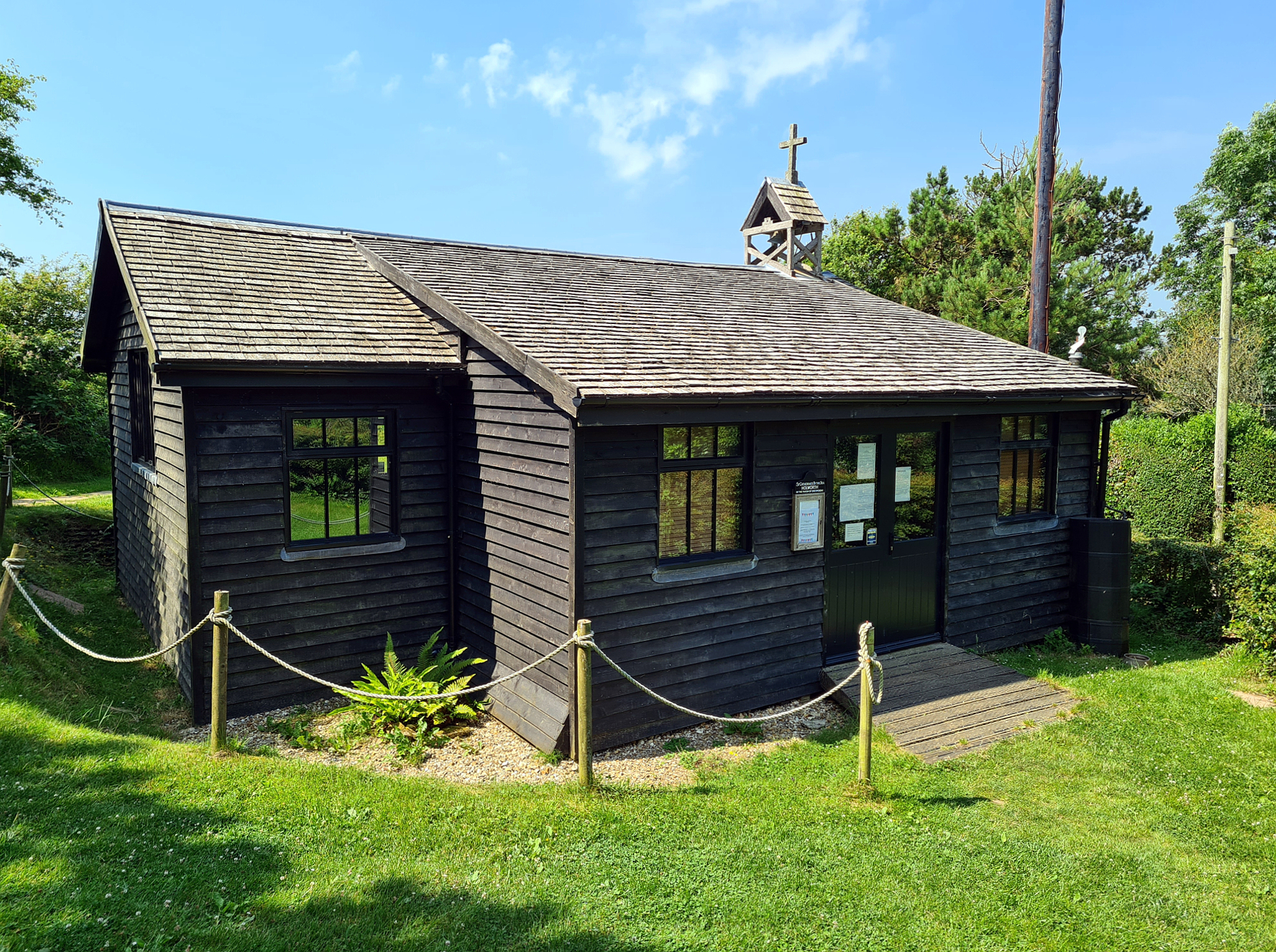

Religion
- Affiliation: Church of England
- Ecclesiastical or organizational status: Active

Location
- Location: Holworth, Dorset, England
- Interactive map of St Catherine-by-the-Sea
- Coordinates: 50.6341°N 2.3370°W

Architecture
- Type: Church
- Completed: 1926

St Catherine-by-the-Sea is a Church of England church in Holworth, Dorset, England. The small wooden church, which forms part of the Watercombe Benefice, holds a service on the fourth Sunday of the month.

== History ==
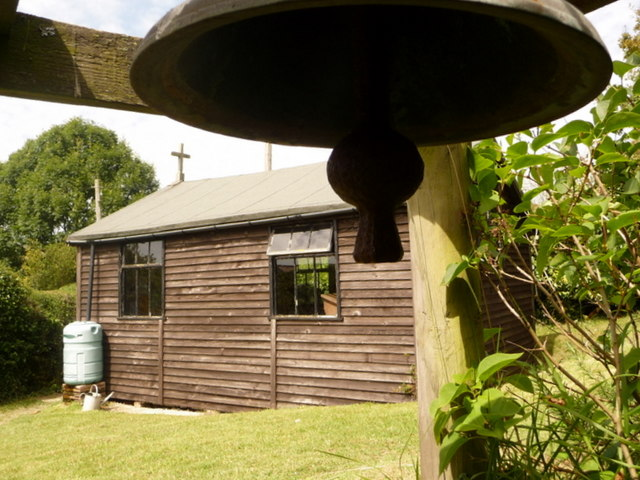
St Catherine-by-the-Sea and its bell in 2009, prior to the 2010 refurbishment and extension.

The church of St Catherine-by-the-Sea was built to serve the scattered population in and around Holworth, all of whom were at least two miles from a church. In circa 1887, the Bishop of Salisbury, the Right Rev. John Wordsworth, gave permission to Rev. Robert Linklater of Holworth House for Holy Communion to be celebrated in the house. The congregation became so large that services had to be held in the house's entrance hall. In circa 1904, a large kitchen in a nearby cottage owned by Mr. and Mrs. Edward Duke of Dorchester was also made available to local inhabitants for Divine service.

In 1906, Rev. Linklater had a larger private chapel created by converting the house's stable block. The chapel, dedicated to St Catherine-by-the-Sea, opened for Divine service on 15 July 1906. The woodwork was done by Mr. Moore of Owermoigne and all masonry work by Mr. Walter Toms of Winfrith Newburgh. In August 1906, the chapel was presented with a bible gifted by Mr. and Mrs. E. Barnaby-Duke. It was dedicated on 12 August and first used during that day's evening service by Rev. Pickard-Cambridge, the rector of Warmwell.

After Rev. Linklater's death in 1915, his wife, Mrs. Mary Catherine Linklater, sold Holworth House in 1919. She was particularly keen to find an owner who would continue the religious work of her late husband. Mrs. Linklater then moved into a nearby cottage. In 1926, she had a small wooden church, once again dedicated to St Catherine-by-the-Sea, built to the west of Holworth House, in memory of her late husband. It succeeded the house's private chapel in fulfilling the religious needs of the local inhabitants. Upon the death of Mrs. Linklater in 1942, she bequeathed £200 towards the church and also part of her property at Holworth for its future upkeep.

=== 2010 refurbishment and extension ===
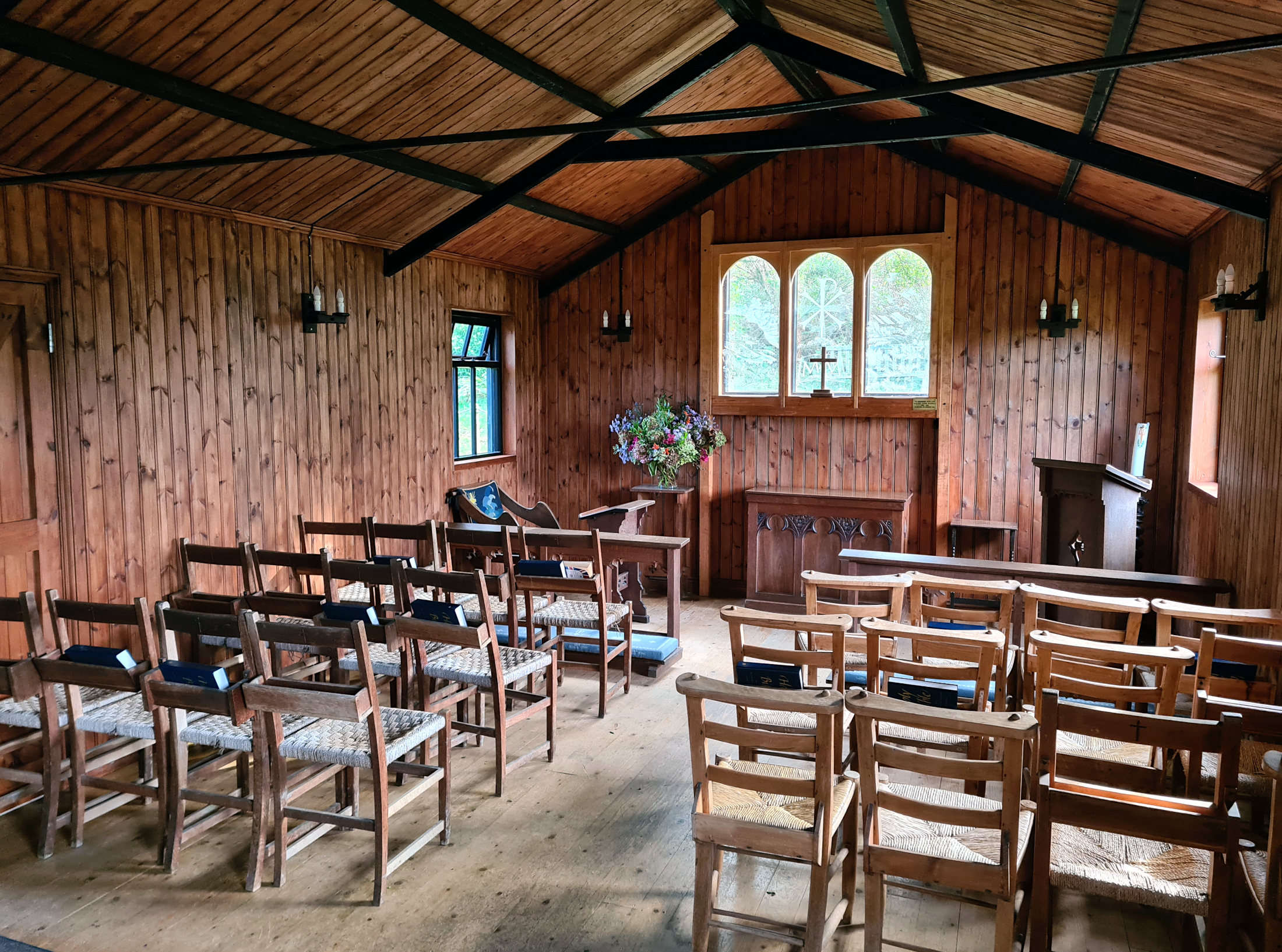
Interior of St Catherine-by-the-Sea.

In 2002, it was discovered that the Linklater Trust had approximately £200,000 available to spend on the church. Proposals were made to demolish the existing building and build a replacement, which was met with opposition from members of the congregation. A petition was launched to retain the existing church. In 2003, after facing pressure from local opposition and from Save Britain's Heritage, the trustees dropped their redevelopment plans.

In 2010, planning permission was granted to carry out alterations to the church, which included adding a single-storey extension on the north and east sides. In addition to the extensions, the church was extensively refurbished. A new east window, designed by Simon Whistler, was installed as part of the project, as was a new electric organ.

== Fittings ==
The church's bell was gifted by Lieutenant Commander Michael Forder of the Royal Navy. It originally belonged to the S-class submarine HMS Sleuth and was given to Forder by the Admiralty. It hung outside his house for a number of years before he gifted it to the church.
