= Bran Point =

Headland in Dorset, England

Coordinates: 50.6314°N 2.3656°W

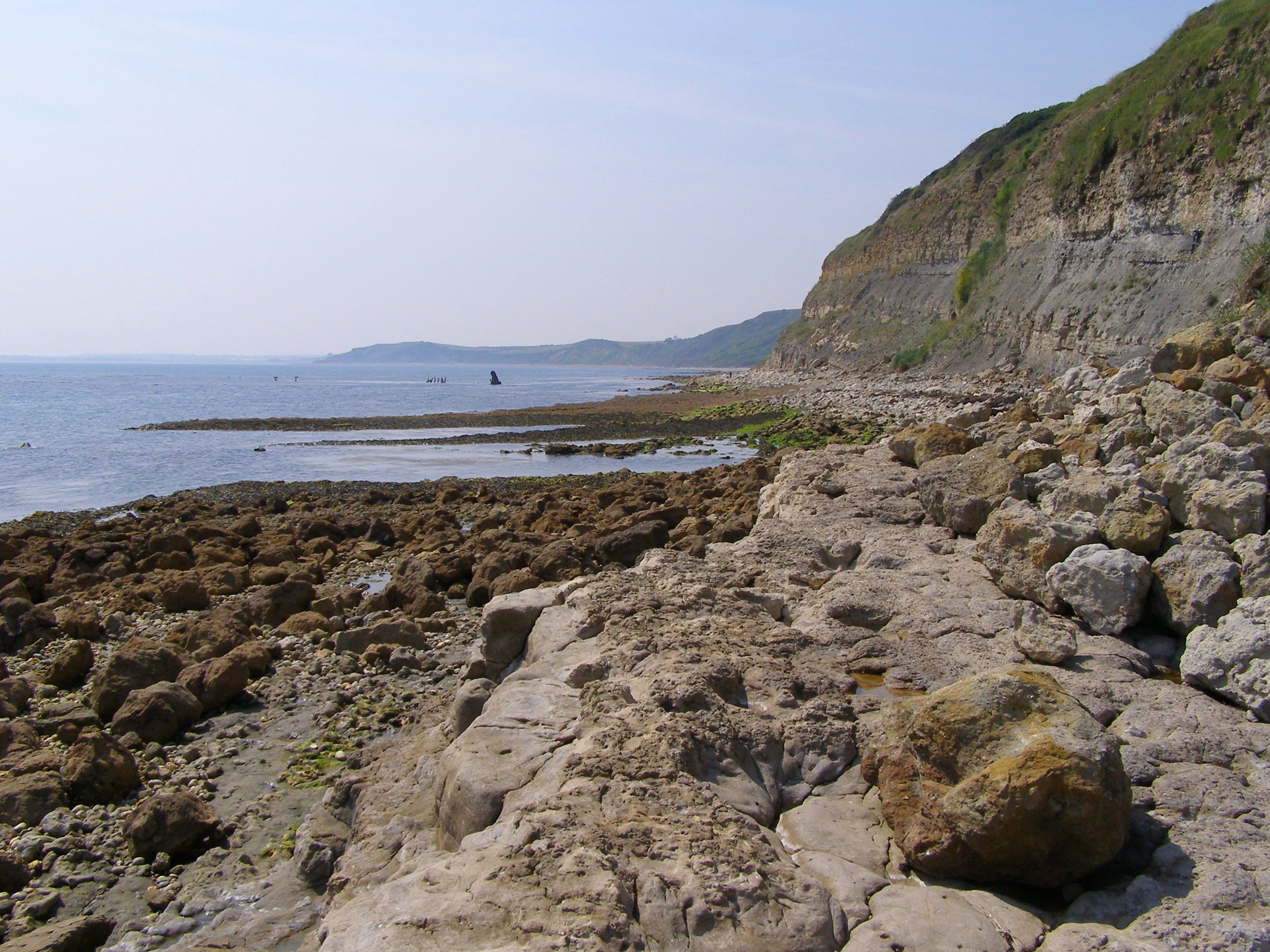
View west from Bran Ledge towards Redcliff Point

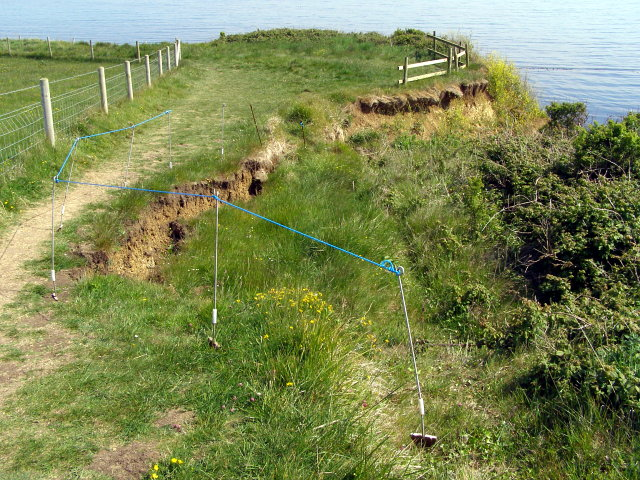
Slipping cliff top and path above Bran Point

Bran Point is a small headland on the Dorset coast in southern England, about halfway between the small villages of Ringstead to the east and Osmington Mills to the west. There is a picturesque cliff-top path between the two villages via Bran Point.

The name derives from the brown colouring of the rock forming the cliffs of the headland, caused in part by residual oil deposits. The geology of the area is particularly interesting. The coastline in the area is formed from rocks and shingle with exposed cliffs behind. The Middle White Oolite of the Osmington Oolite more visible to the west has descended to beach level here. At the middle of the cliff, there is nodular rubble consisting of calcitized sponge spicules. Higher in the cliff are reddish brown beds containing Myophorella clavellata fossils.

== See also ==
- Geology of Dorset
- Black Head
- Redcliff Point
- White Nothe
