= RAF Ringstead =

Former military radar site in Dorset, England

RAF Ringstead
- Ringstead Bay, Dorset in England
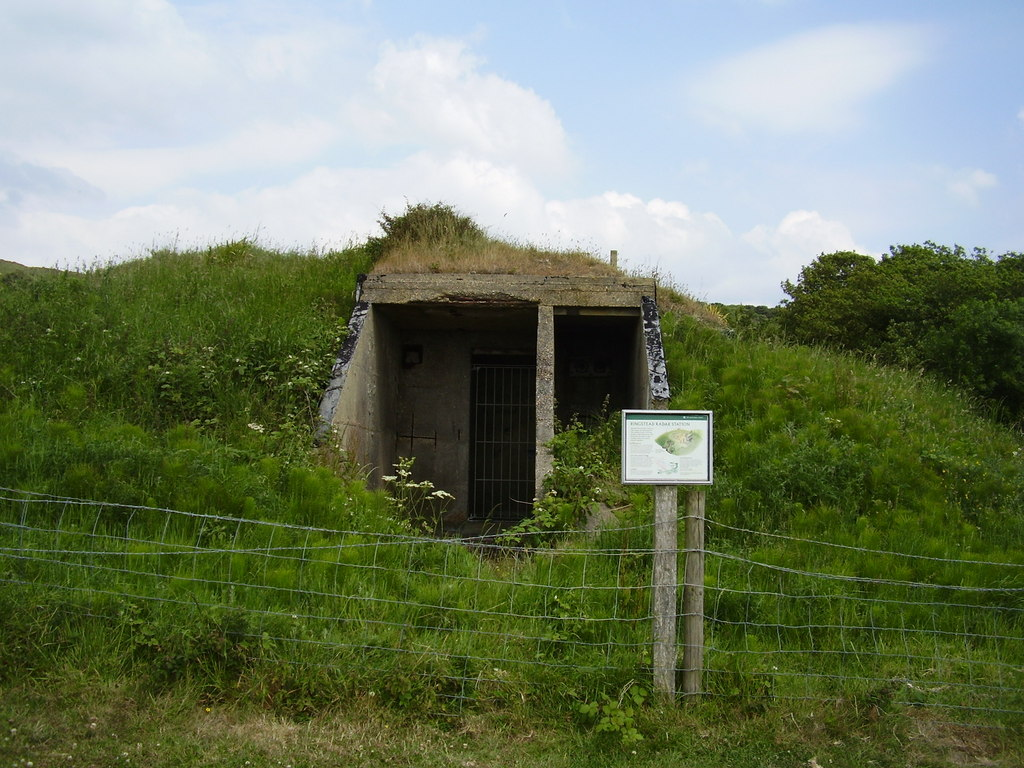
- One of the former transmitter blocks of RAF Ringstead in 2011

Site information
- Type: Royal Air Force Station
- Owner: Ministry of Defence
- Operator: Royal Air Force; United States Air Force

Location
- Shown within Dorset RAF Ringstead (the United Kingdom)
- Coordinates: 50°38′03″N 002°20′35″W

Site history
- Built: 1941
- In use: 1942 - 1946
- Battles/wars: European theatre of World War II; Cold War

RAF Ringstead is a former Royal Air Force radar station at Ringstead Bay, Dorset, England. It is notable for having served three separate functions: first as a Chain Home early-warning radar station during WWII and then, during the Cold War, as a Rotor station and then, finally, as a USAF Tropospheric scatter station. The first of these functions commenced in 1942; the last of the functions ceased in 1974. The structural remains were Grade II listed in 2020.

== Chain Home ==
Chain Home was a ring of early warning radar stations built around the coastline as part of the Second World War defences from the late 1930s onwards.

RAF Ringstead Chain Home Radar Station (known as AMES12B and CH12B) was built in 1941, and was fully operational by March 1942. It was designed with well-dispersed structures: doubled-up transmitter and receiver blocks, a substation and a standby set house in earth-bound bunkers, four 325ft steel transmitter aerial masts and two 240ft self-supporting timber receiver aerial towers. Ringstead Chain Home was stood down in 1945.

== Rotor station ==
In 1952, the former Chain Home station was refurbished into a Rotor station site (known as SRD). The Rotor programme was developed to update previous wartime radar technology and to install more capable radar systems to detect and locate fast-flying jets. The former Chain Home station became the technical site of the Rotor station; Upton Farm, 2 km to the north, became the domestic site, where personnel were accommodated. It closed in 1956.

== Tropospheric scatter ==
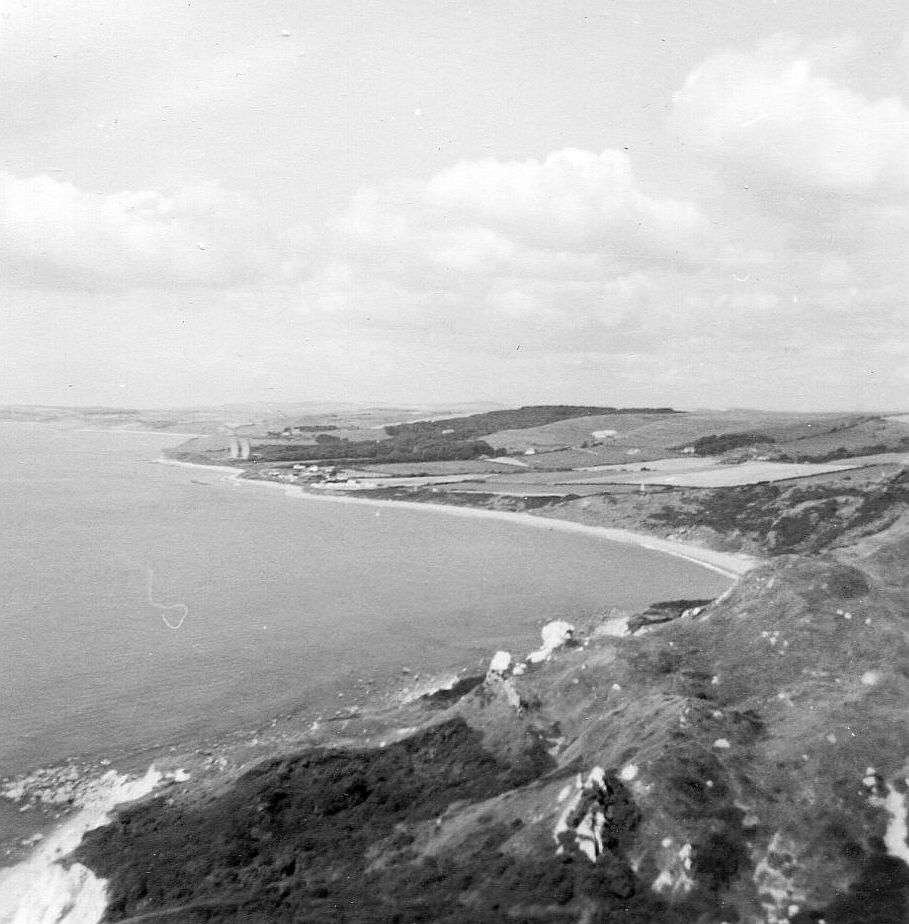
View of Ringstead Bay with the two large radar masts in the distance in 1966

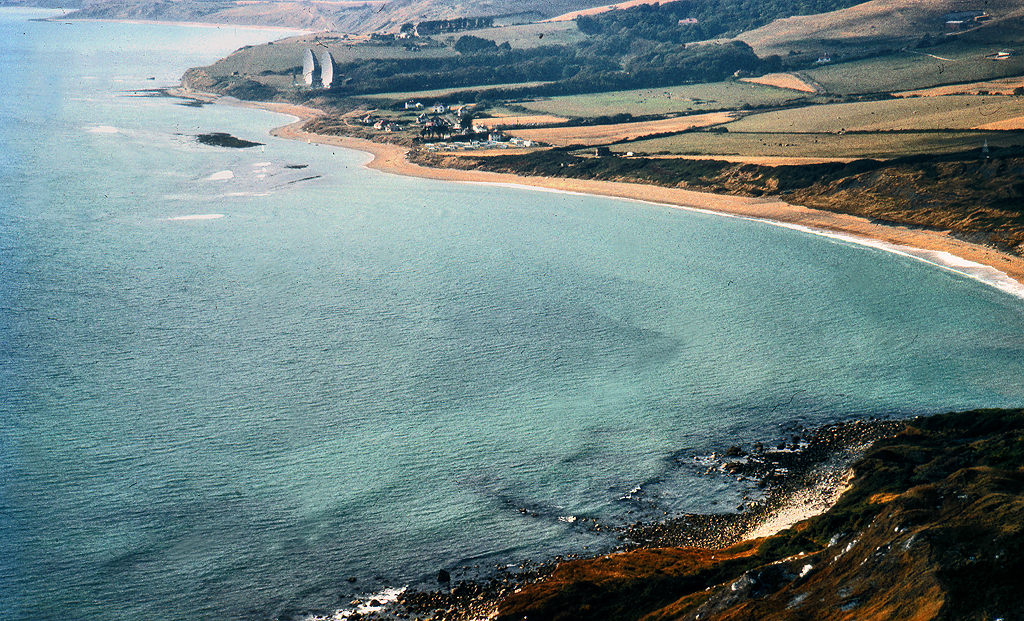
Ringstead Bay and the station's two parabolic aerials in circa 1970

In 1963, a United States Air Force Tropospheric scatter station was established at Ringstead to provide a cross-channel relay link from High Wycombe Atomic Joint Co-Ordination Centre to a counterpart network in Gorramendi, near Elizondo, in the Spanish Pyrenees. Two parabolic aerials were erected as part of this refurbishment. The Tropospheric Scatter station was operated by USAF No 6 Detachment, 2180 Communications Squadron, and closed in 1974.

== Legacy ==
The Tropospheric Scatter station parabolic aerials were dismantled in 1975. The Wessex Hang Gliding Club use the field where the aerials were formerly located for emergency landings.

The bunker is on land owned by the National Trust, and the Trust occasionally run open days.

The radar station was listed Grade II in 2020, as one of the best-preserved Chain Home stations in southwest England, and as such a rare example of its type. One of the two transmitting blocks is proposed for conversion to holiday accommodation. Planning permission was granted in 2021 for a conversion designed by Lipton Plant Architects.

== See also ==
- List of former Royal Air Force stations
