= Ringstead Bay =

Bay in Dorset, England

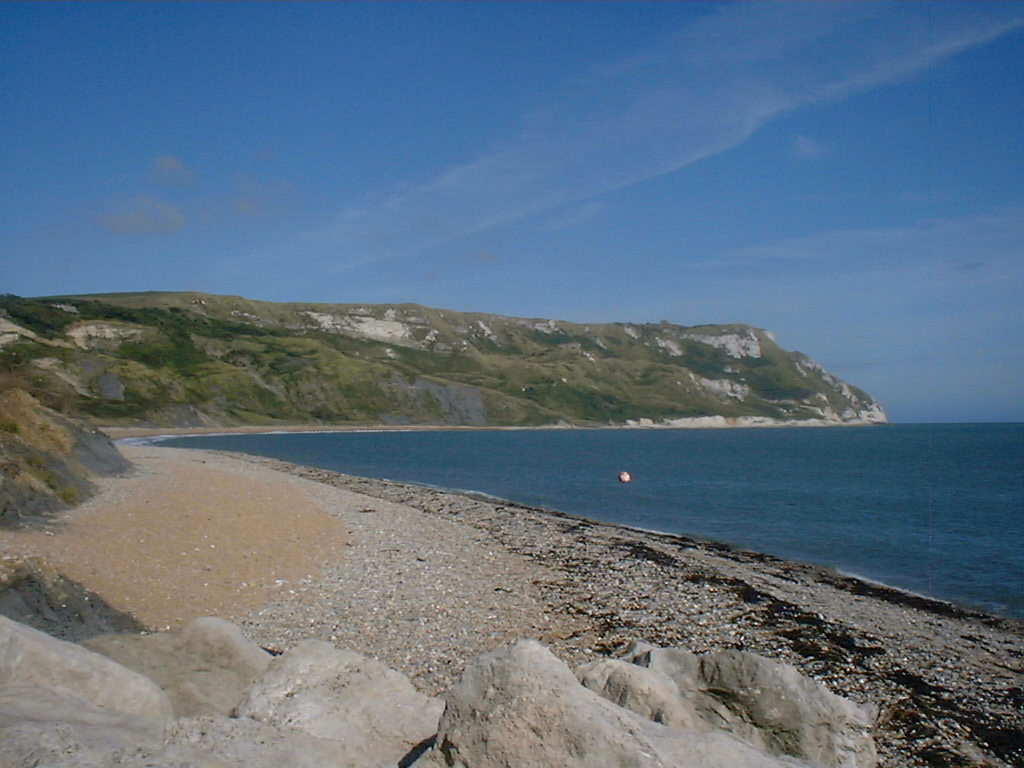
- Ringstead Bay with White Nothe to the east in the background

- Location within Dorset
- Location: Dorset, England
- Coordinates: 50°37′51″N 2°20′16″W
- Part of: Jurassic Coast, English Channel
- Managing agency: National Trust
- Website: www.nationaltrust.org.uk/ringstead-bay

Ringstead Bay is an open bay of the English Channel located 5 miles (8 km) east of Weymouth in Dorset, England. The bay lies on the Jurassic Coast and in the Dorset National Landscape area, and is known for its natural environment and fossils.

The small village of Ringstead is at the western end of the bay, and the prominent headland of White Nothe at the eastern end. It was the location of RAF Ringstead radar station between 1942 and 1974.

== Geology ==
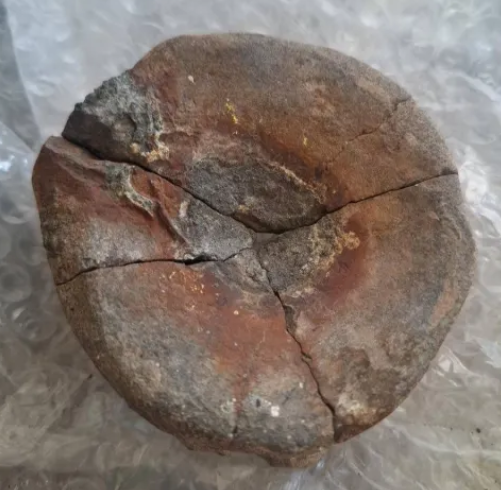
This ophthalmosaurid Ichthyosaur vertebra is an example of a fossil collected from Ringstead Bay. It was found in 1971.

Ringstead Bay has a pebble and shingle beach with some sand. There are offshore reefs approximately 600 metres (660 yd) in length at the western end opposite the village that are uncovered at low tide. These forms an intertidal zone between the low cliffs to the north and the English Channel to the south.

The Ringstead Coral Bed is a geological formation exposed at Ringstead Bay. It preserves fossils dating back to the Jurassic.

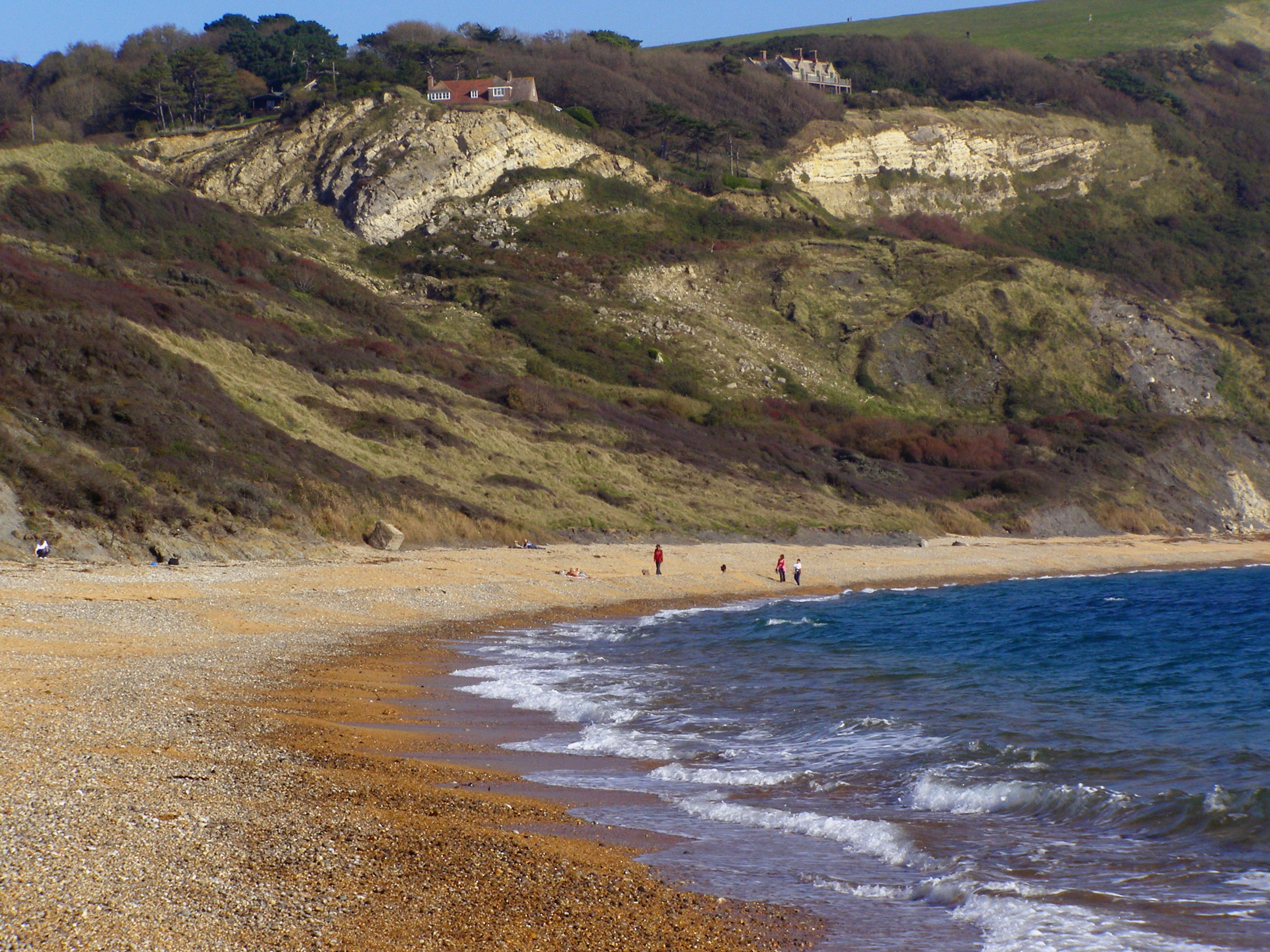
Beach and cliffs, Ringstead Bay

Immediately to the east are the white chalk cliffs of White Nothe, dominating the bay. Below is Burning Cliff. It is possible to walk to the top of White Nothe and back, with views of the bay and across to the Isle of Portland.

== Recreation and tourism ==
Ringstead Bay is accessible by way of a private road with a car park at the end near the sea and Ringstead village. There is an alternative free car park in the National Trust area further inland, with footpath access to the sea. It is also possible to walk to Ringstead Bay on a circular walk from Lulworth Cove to the east, via Durdle Door and White Nothe.

Ringstead Bay also has a nudist beach to the east of the main Ringstead beach.

The South West Coast Path long-distance hiking trail, part of the England Coast Path, runs along the cliffs of the bay.
