= White Nothe =

Headland in Dorset, England

- Headland
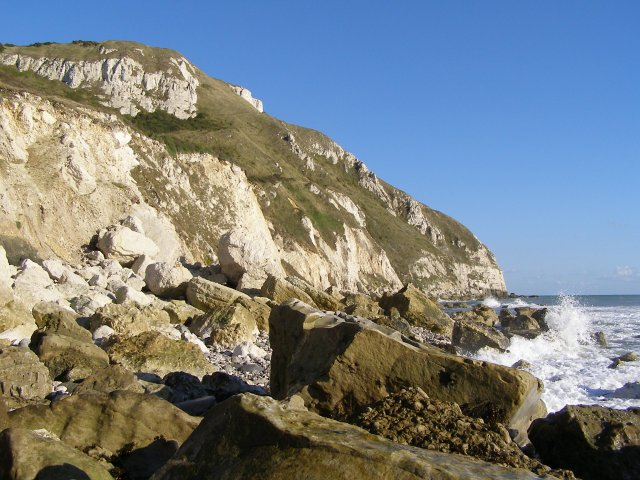
- White Nothe from the shore below the undercliff

- Location within Dorset
- Coordinates: 50°37′38.2″N 2°19′23.1″W
- Location: Dorset, England
- Elevation: 450 ft (140 m)

White Nothe (meaning "White Nose") is a chalk headland on the English Channel coast at the eastern end of Ringstead Bay, east of Weymouth in Dorset, England. The area is well known for its geology and fossils. Its flanks are the result of prehistoric landslides and the inaccessible slopes of the undercliff provide a secluded wildlife habitat.

A zigzag path up the cliff is believed to be one of the locations alluded to as a smuggler's path in the British children's book Moonfleet by J. Meade Falkner. Walking to the base of White Nothe along the shore from Ringstead Bay is possible, but it is cut off at high tide, so much care should be taken. At the top of the Smugglers path, a protruding nose shape comes out of the white cliff, giving the name to the area.

The area is partly owned by the National Trust. From the top of White Nothe, to the east, the chalk headland of Bat's Head can be viewed. Walking east along a clifftop path below the summit of Chaldon Hill is possible to Durdle Door and Lulworth Cove. The Isle of Portland can be seen to the southwest across the sea.

Immediately to the northwest of White Nothe is the Burning Cliff, which from 1826 smouldered with an underground fire for several years due to the bituminous shale.

Situated at the top of White Nothe is a World War II pillbox, constructed in 1940–41 of brick and concrete, as part of the anti-invasion measures. Unusually, the structure is also fitted with a Royal Observer Corps observation post built on top, which was to spot and report aircraft. There is also a row of former coastguards' cottages.

White Nothe has featured in artworks.

== Gallery ==
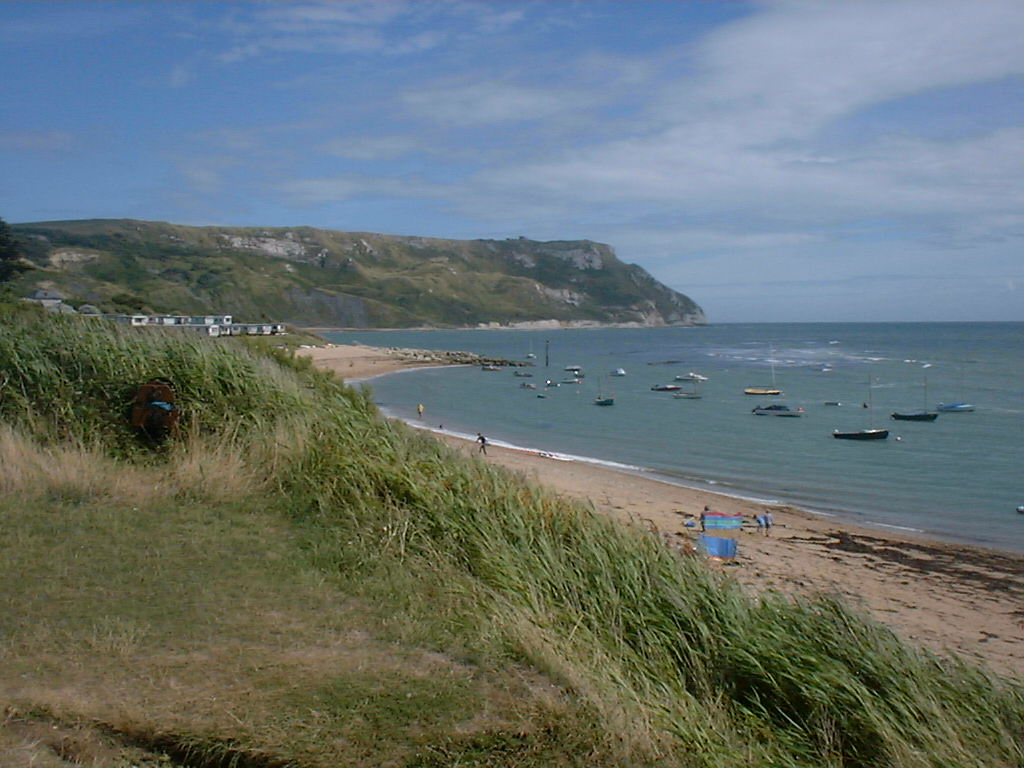
White Nothe from Ringstead beach

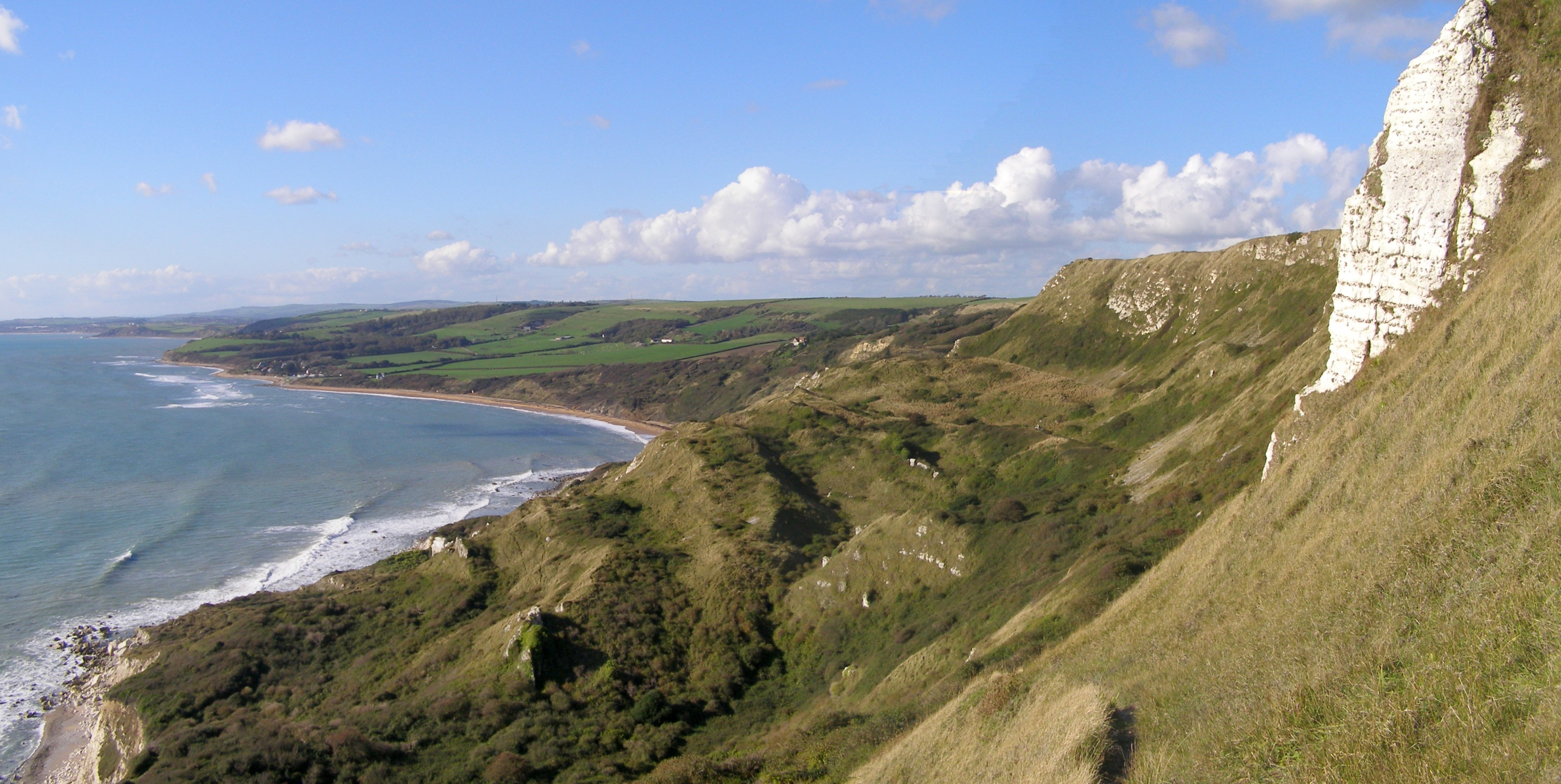
White Nothe undercliff and Ringstead Bay from the Smugglers Path

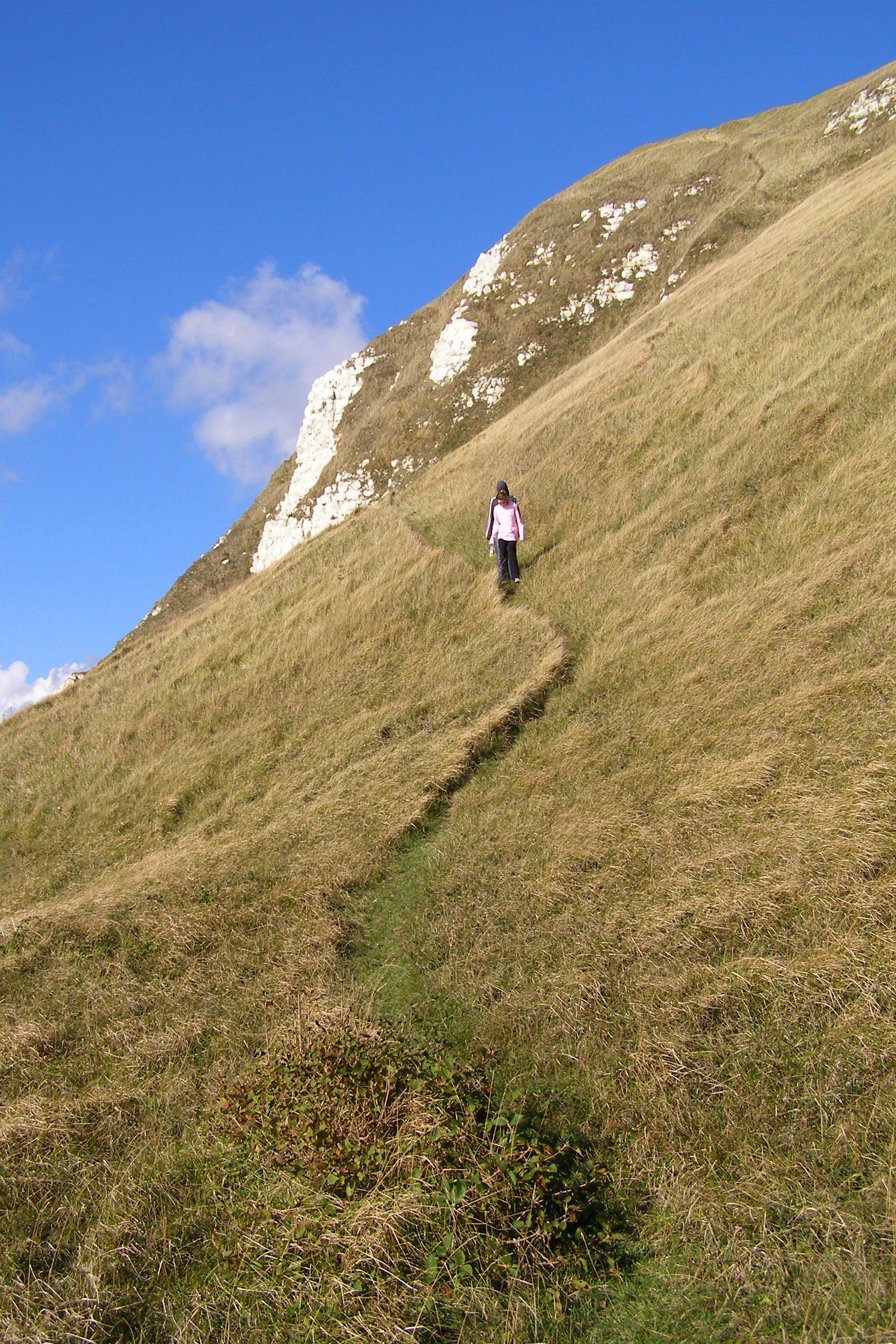
The Smugglers' Path

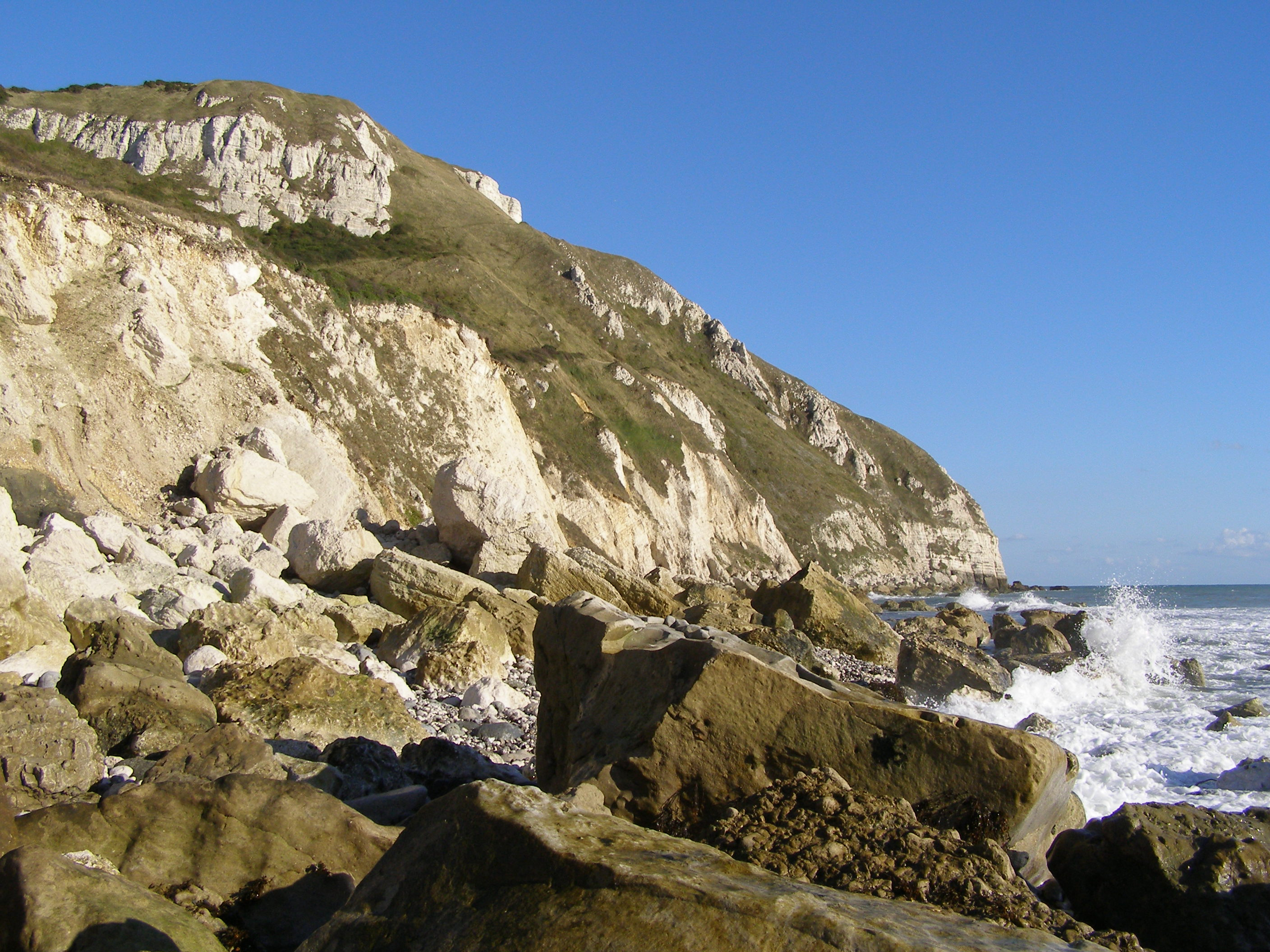
The headland from the shore below the undercliff

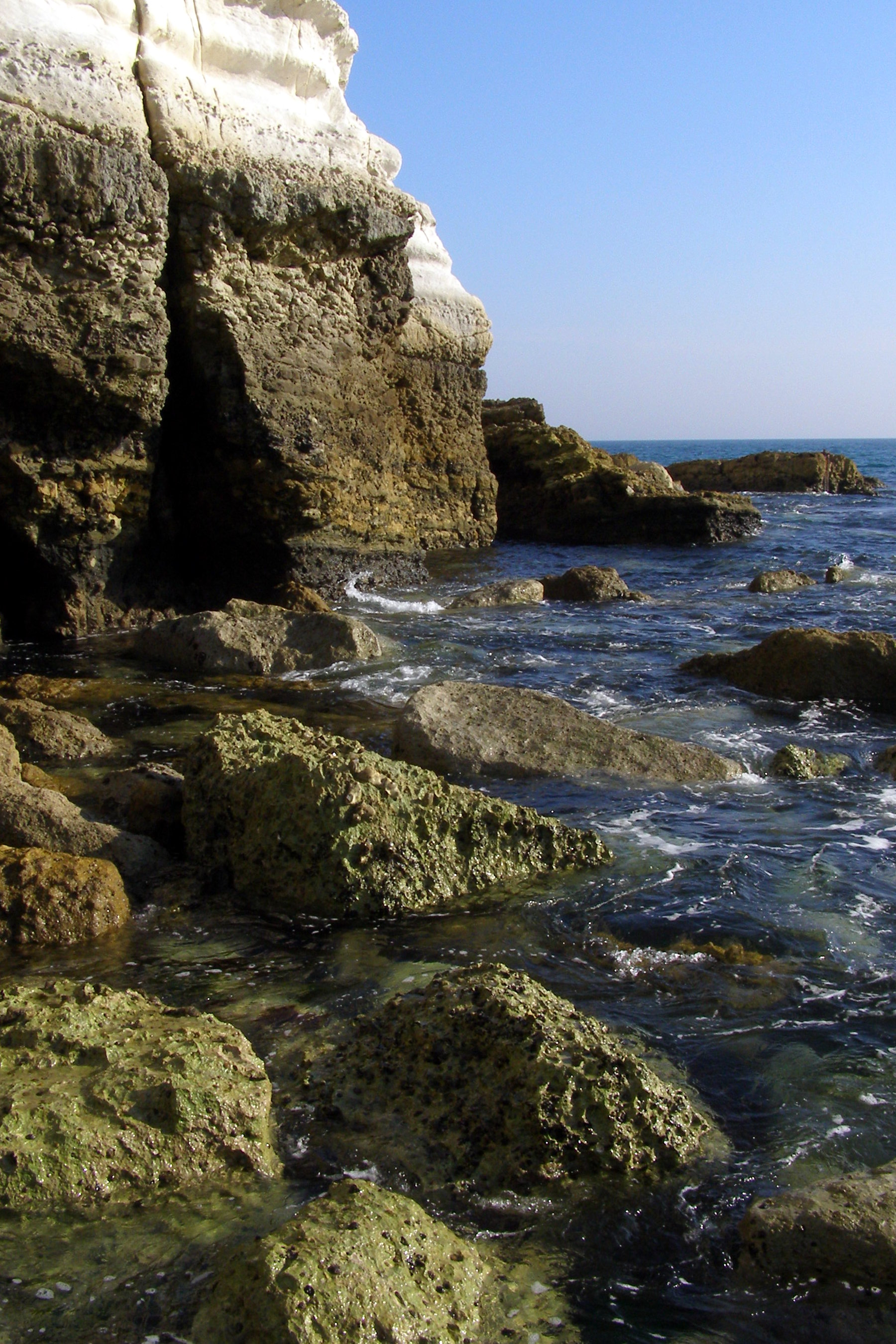
The west side of the headland at sea level

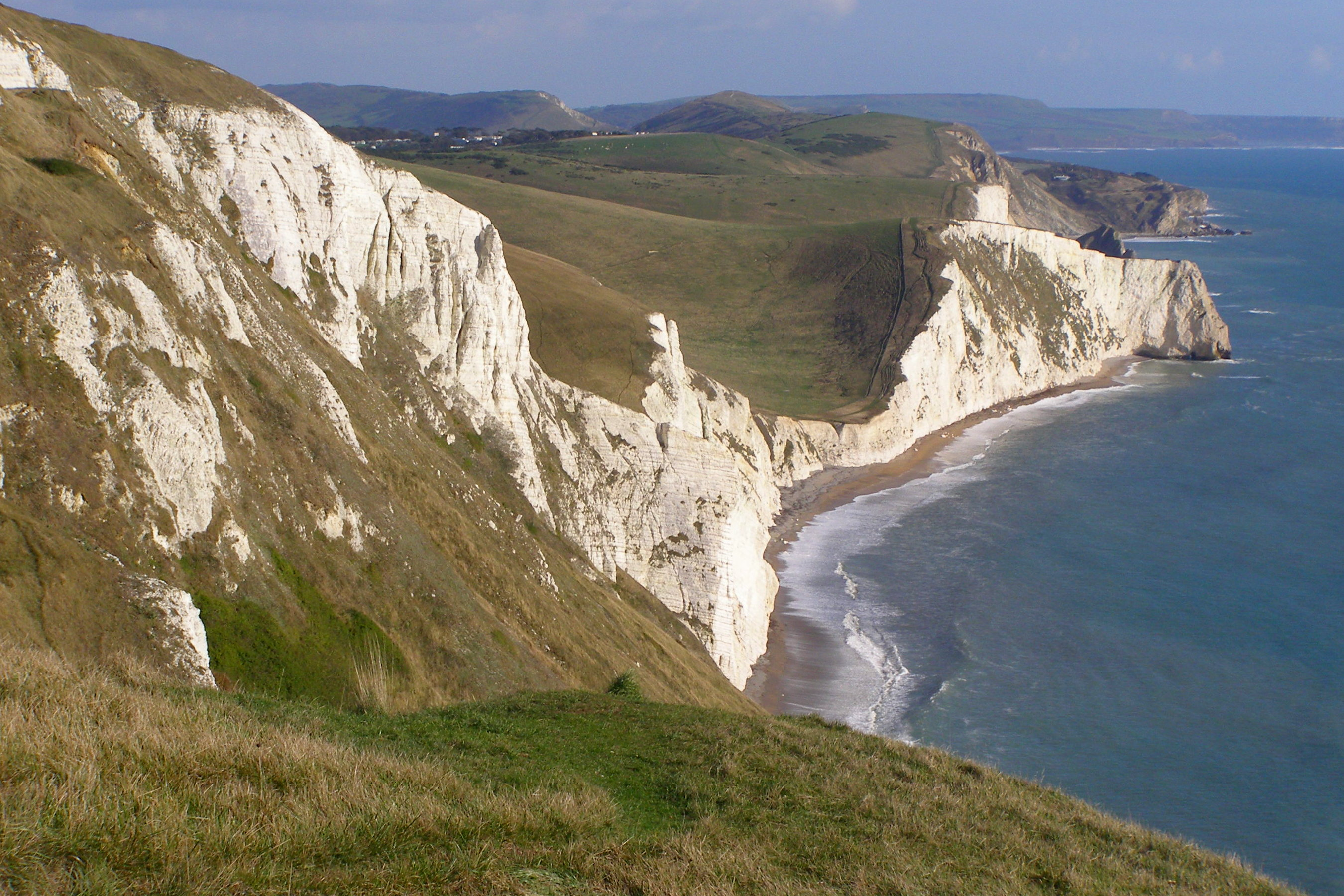
View east from White Nothe

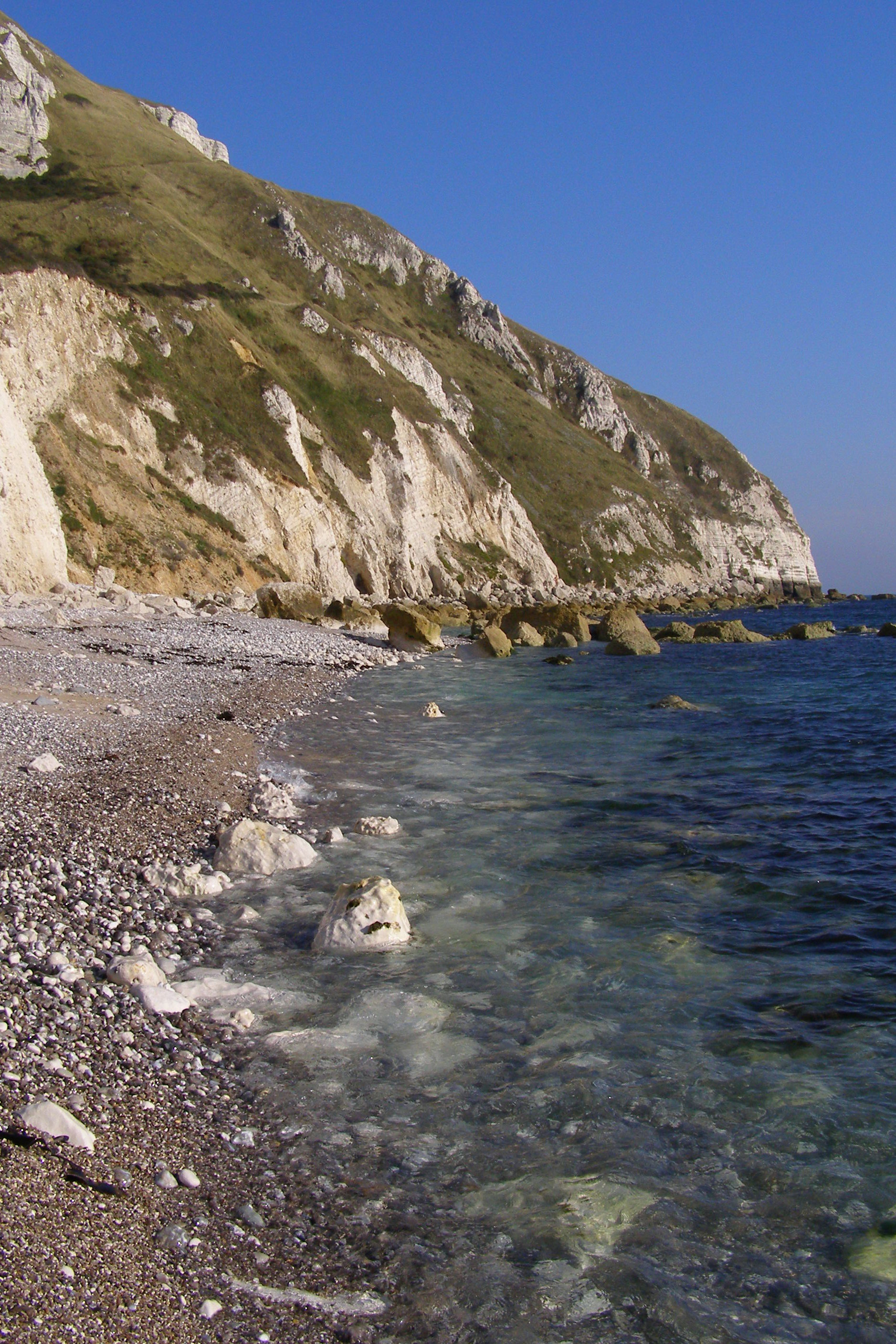
The headland from the shore below the undercliff

== See also ==
- Geology of Dorset
- Jurassic Coast
- Bat's Head
- Black Head
- Bran Point
- Redcliff Point
- Ringstead Bay
