= Osmington Mills =

Hamlet in Dorset, England

Coordinates: 50.6356°N 2.3754°W

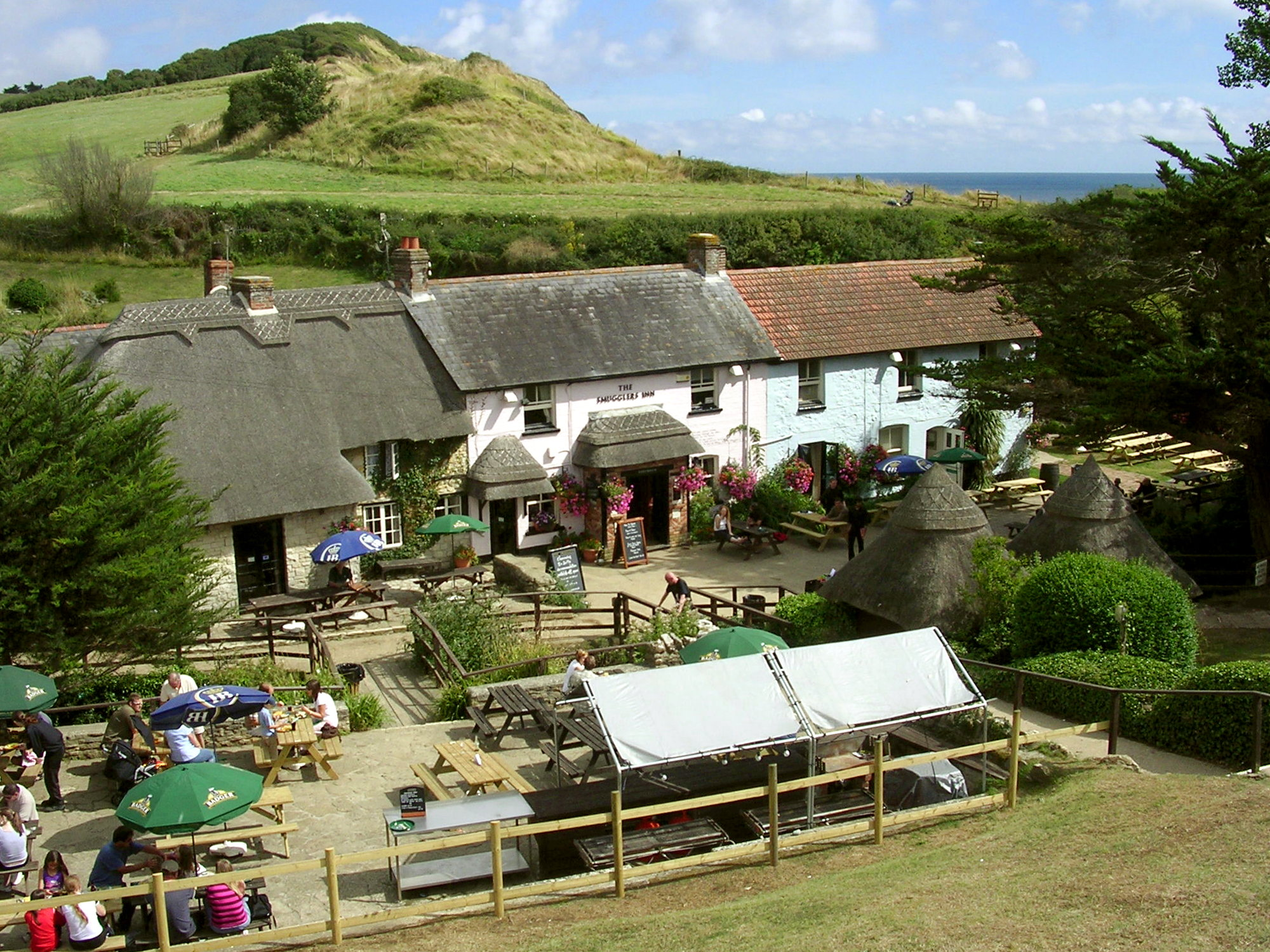
- The Smugglers' Inn at Osmington Mills

- Location within Dorset
- OS grid reference: SY734820
- Unitary authority: Dorset
- Ceremonial county: Dorset
- Region: South West
- Country: England
- Sovereign state: United Kingdom
- Post town: WEYMOUTH
- Postcode district: DT3
- Dialling code: 01305
- Police: Dorset
- Fire: Dorset and Wiltshire
- Ambulance: South Western
- UK Parliament: South Dorset

Osmington Mills is a coastal hamlet in the English county of Dorset. It lies within the civil parish of Osmington 5 miles (8.0 km) northeast of Weymouth.

== Geology ==
The coastline around Osmington Mills is part of Dorset's Jurassic Coast, and fossils can be found in the cliffs. The rocks consist of Kimmeridge Clay and the Corallian group from the Oxfordian (Upper Jurassic) and have an interesting trace fossil assemblage. To the west are Black Head and beyond that Redcliff Point, with fossils in the Upper Oxford Clay.

== Tourism ==
Osmington Mills is popular with tourists, providing facilities such as camping and caravan sites, a public house (of which the site has been traced back to the 13th century), and attractive coastal walks.

== John Constable ==
The area around Osmington Mills and Osmington Bay was painted by the English landscape artist John Constable in the early 19th century. He spent his honeymoon in the area in 1816. Paintings include:

- Osmington Bay
- A View of Osmington Bay
- Weymouth Bay from the Downs above Osmington Mills
- Weymouth Bay: Bowleaze Cove and Jordon Hill

== See also ==
- Geology of Dorset
- Trigoniidae, found particularly around Osmington Mills

== Gallery ==
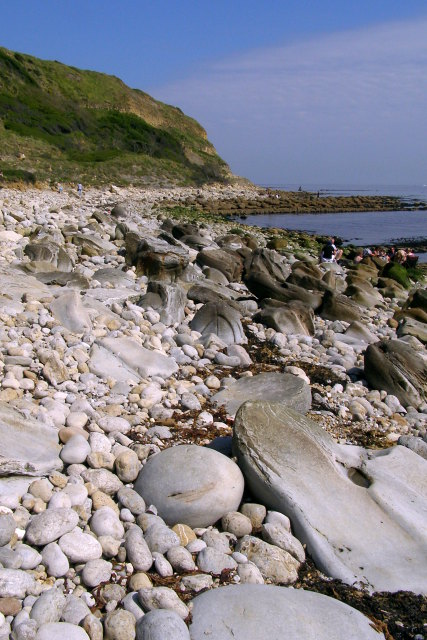
The rounded nodules on the beach to the east of Osmington Mills are of calcite-cemented sandstone and come from the Bencliff Grit Formation which is found at the base of the cliffs.

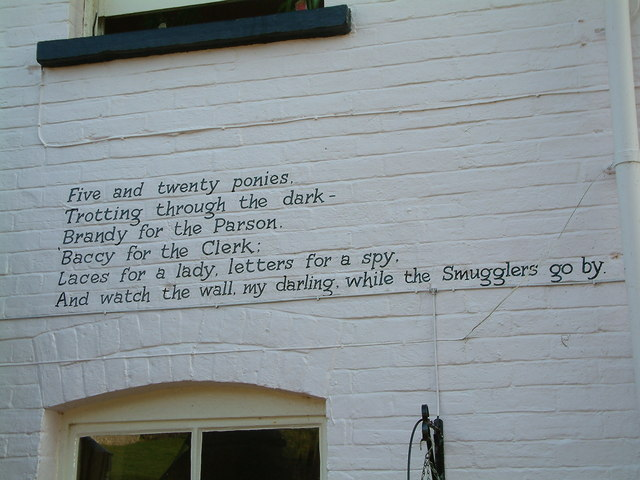
Poetry at the
'Smugglers Inn' (Based on Rudyard Kipling's A Smuggler's Song)

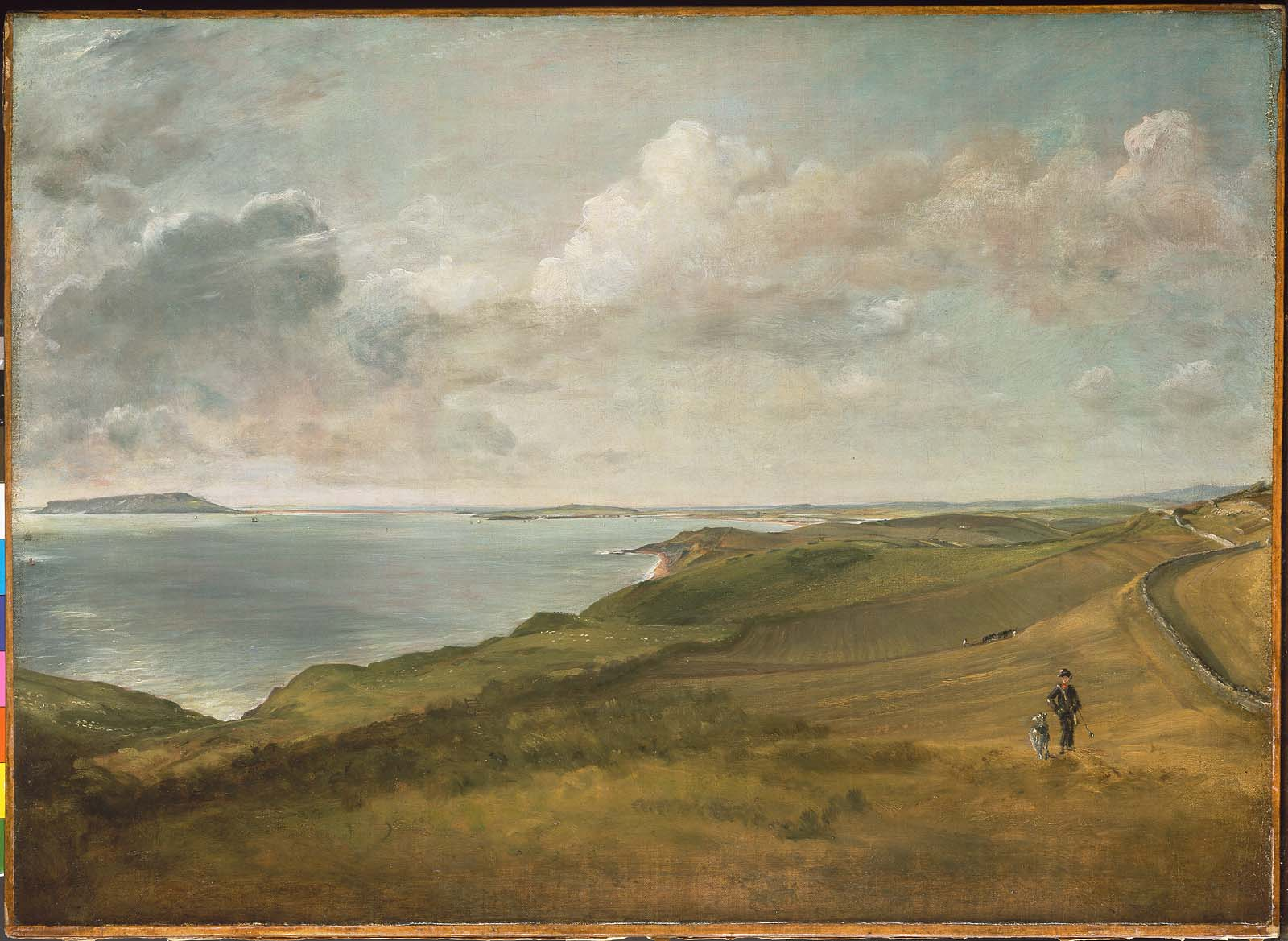
Weymouth Bay from the Downs above Osmington Mills, John Constable, (c. 1816)
