= Hertford College, Oxford =

College of the University of Oxford

Hertford College
- University of Oxford
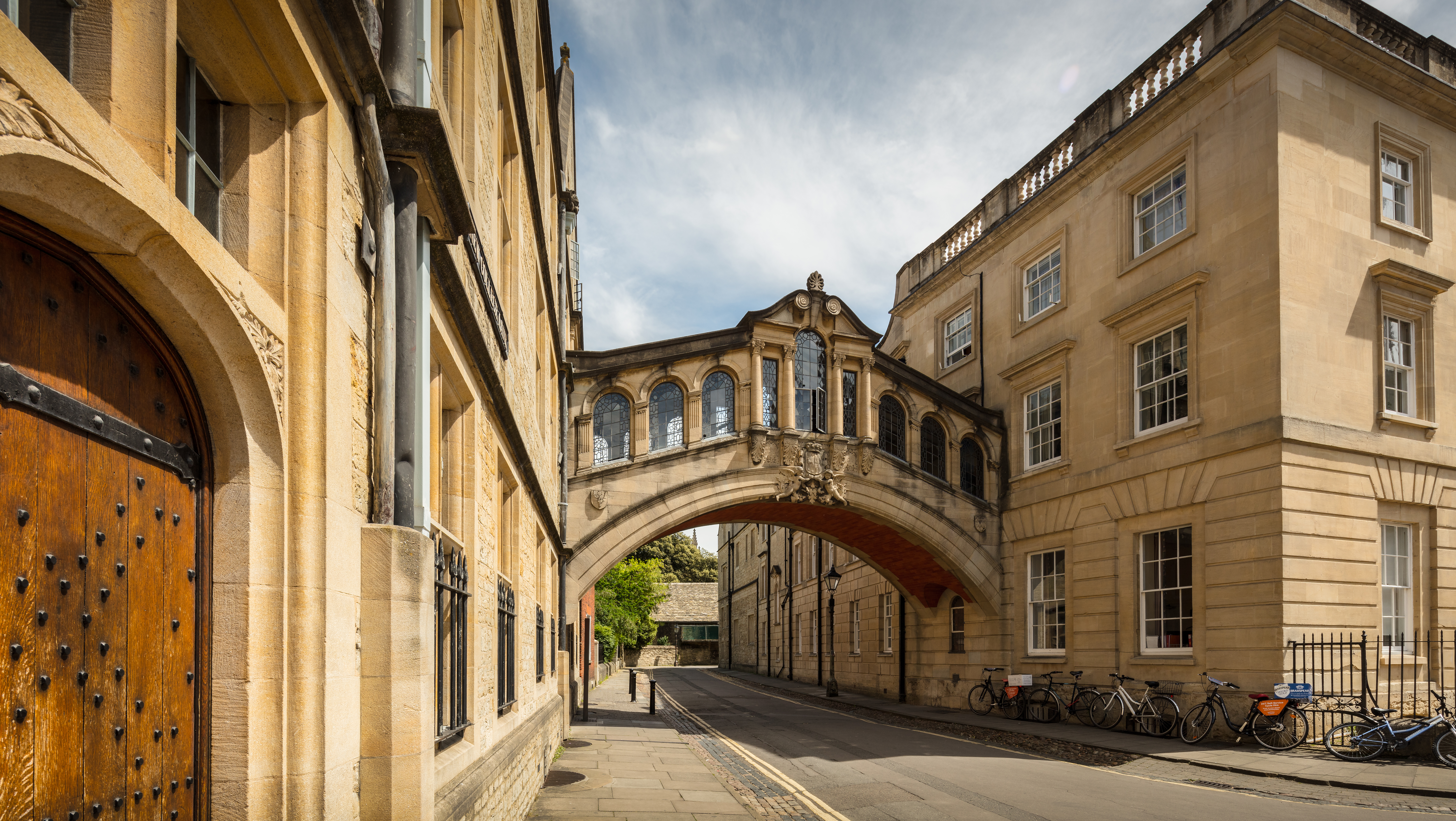
- The Bridge of Sighs

- Arms: Gules, a hart's head cabossed argent, attired and between the attire a cross patty Or, fitched in the foot
- Location: Catte Street, Oxford OX1 3BW
- Coordinates: 51.754205°N 1.253467°W
- Full name: Hertford College in the University of Oxford
- Latin name: Collegium Hertfordense, Collegium Hertfordiense
- Motto: Sicut cervus anhelat ad fontes aquarum (Latin)
- Motto in English: As the hart panteth after the water brooks
- Established: 1280s (as Hart Hall); 1490 (as Magdalen Hall); 1874 (as Hertford College)
- Named for: Elias de Hertford
- Sister college: None
- Principal: Alexandra Freeman
- Undergraduates: 403 (2017/2018)
- Postgraduates: 222
- Grace: Benedictus benedicat May the Blessed One bless Benedicto benedicatur May the Blessed One be blessed
- Endowment: £64.9 million (2018)
- Website: hertford.ox.ac.uk
- Boat club: Hertford College Boat Club

Map
- Location within Oxford city centre

Hertford College (/ˈhɑːrtfərd/ HART-fərd) is a constituent college of the University of Oxford in England. It is located on Catte Street in the centre of Oxford, directly opposite the main gate to the Bodleian Library. The college's Old and New Buildings Quadrangles are connected by the Bridge of Sighs, an Oxford landmark.

The first foundation on the Hertford site began in the 1280s as Hart Hall and became a college in 1740 but was dissolved in 1816. In 1820, the site was taken over by Magdalen Hall, which had emerged around 1490 on a site adjacent to Magdalen College. In 1874, Magdalen Hall was incorporated as a college, reviving the name Hertford College. In 1974, Hertford was part of the first group of all-male Oxford colleges to admit women. There are around 600 students at the college at any one time, comprising undergraduates, graduates and visiting students from overseas.

Alumni of the college's predecessor institutions include William Tyndale, John Donne, Thomas Hobbes, Jonathan Swift and Henry Pelham. More recently, former students have included author Evelyn Waugh, the first female Home Secretary Jacqui Smith, the civil servants Jeremy Heywood and Olly Robbins, philosopher and cognitive scientist Daniel Dennett, and the newsreaders and reporters Fiona Bruce, Carrie Gracie, Krishnan Guru-Murthy, and Natasha Kaplinsky. U.S. Supreme Court Justice Byron White attended the college on a Rhodes scholarship but left to serve in World War II.

== History ==
=== Hart Hall and the first Hertford College ===
==== Hart Hall ====
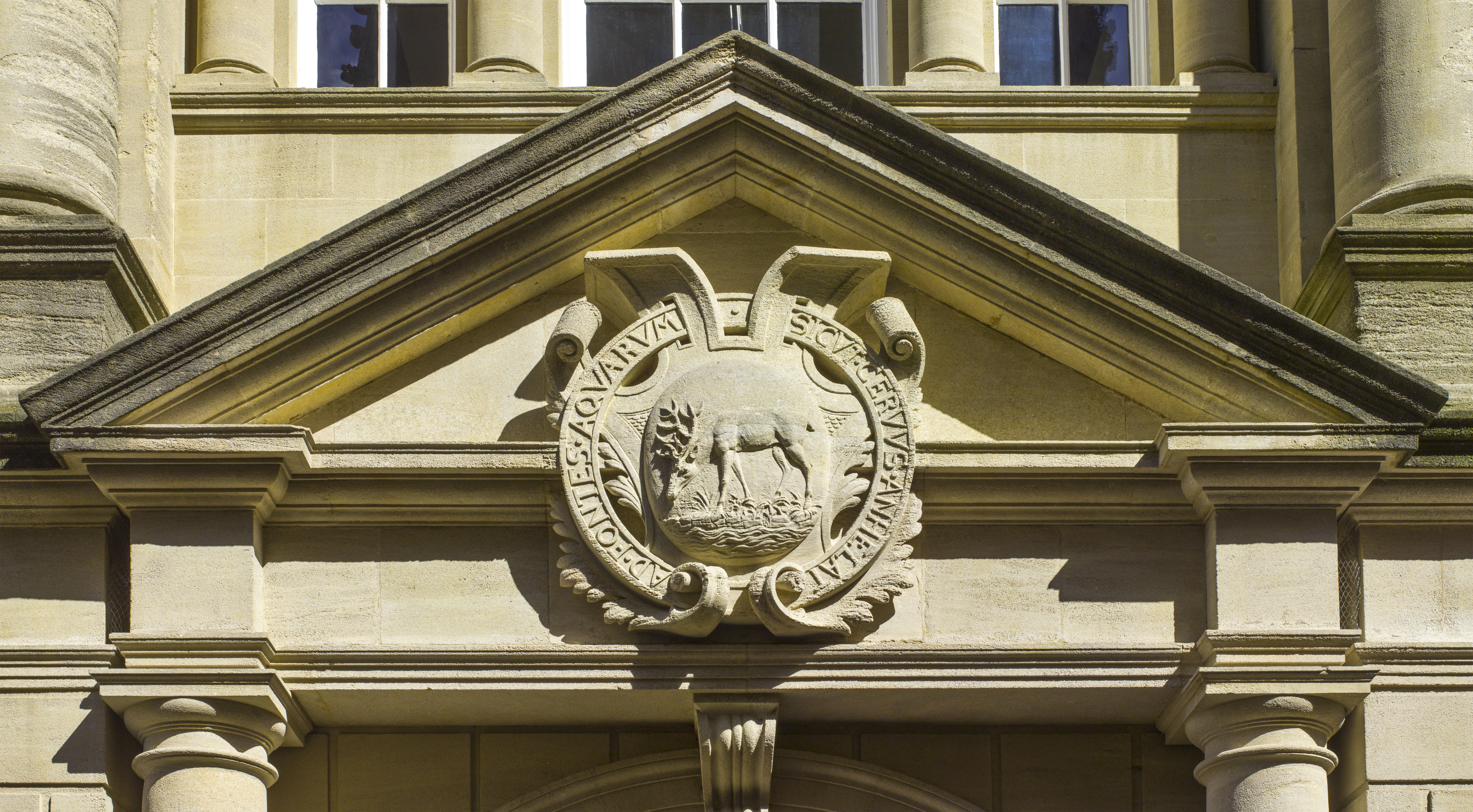
The drinking hart with motto as above the modern main gate of Hertford College

The first Hertford College began life as Hart Hall (Aula Cervina) in the 1280s, a small tenement built roughly where the college's Old Hall is today, a few paces along New College Lane on the southern side. In medieval Oxford, academic halls were primarily lodging houses for students and resident tutors.

The original tenement, mentioned in the deed of 1283, which was bought by Elias de Hertford from Walter de Grendon, mercer, lay between a tenement of the university (Blackhall) on the west, and a tenement of the Prioress of Studley on the east. In the deed by which Elias de Hertford sells it to John de Dokelynton in 1301, this last tenement is called Micheldhall. The deed was made over to his son, also Elias, in 1301. The name of the hall was likely a humorous reduction of the name of its founder's home town, and allowed for the use of the symbol of a hart to be used for identification.

At that time, New College Lane was known as Hammer Hall Lane (named after a hall to the east, as New College had not then been founded), and its northern side was the old town wall. The corner of Hammer Hall Lane and Catte Street (which had a postern in the wall called Smithgate) was taken by Black Hall, which was the place of John Wycliffe's imprisonment by the Vice-Chancellor around 1378. On the other side of Hart Hall along the lane was Shield Hall. On Catte Street itself was the entrance to Arthur Hall, which lay down a narrow passage behind Hart Hall, and Cat Hall (Aula Murilegorum), which stood further south, roughly where the Principal's Lodgings now stand.

The younger Elias sold on Hart Hall (named in this deed as 'le Herthalle') after a month to a wealthy local fishmonger John of Ducklington, who, seven years later, bought Arthur Hall and annexed it to Hart Hall. In 1312, John sold the two halls to Walter de Stapledon, Bishop of Exeter, who desired to found a college. After just over a year, Stapledon moved his scholars to a larger site that he had purchased on Turl Street, which became Stapledon Hall, later Exeter College. However, Exeter College retained certain rights over Hart Hall, with which it plagued the hall's development for centuries.

In 1379, Hart Hall and Black Hall were rented by William of Wykeham as a temporary home for his scholars as his New College, to the east along what became New College Lane, was being built. The first two Wardens of New College also appear as Principals of Hart Hall. Until the 17th century, there is evidence of scholars (including Thomas Ken) matriculating at Hart Hall while waiting for a vacancy at New College. By this time, it appears that Shield Hall had been partly taken over by Hart Hall and partly demolished to make way for New College's cloister. Although Black Hall continued a separate existence, its principal was often the same as Hart Hall's. In 1490, Hart Hall is described as having a library, which was unusual for a hall. In 1530, Hart Hall annexed Black Hall also. For some time, Cat Hall was leased by All Souls College, and then by Exeter College, until it also was subsumed into the growing Hart Hall early in the 16th century, giving the hall most of the land around what is today its Old Quadrangle.

In the latter half of the 16th century, Hart Hall became known as a refuge for Catholic recusants, particularly under Philip Randell as principal (1548–1599). Because of its connection with Exeter College and that college's increasing puritanism, a number of Exeter's tutors and scholars migrated to Hart Hall. The hall attracted an increasing number of Catholics from further afield, including the Jesuit tutor Richard Holtby in 1574, who was instrumental in the conversion of his student, and later Jesuit martyr and saint, Alexander Briant to Catholicism. Coming from a Catholic family, the English poet John Donne came up to Hart Hall in 1584.

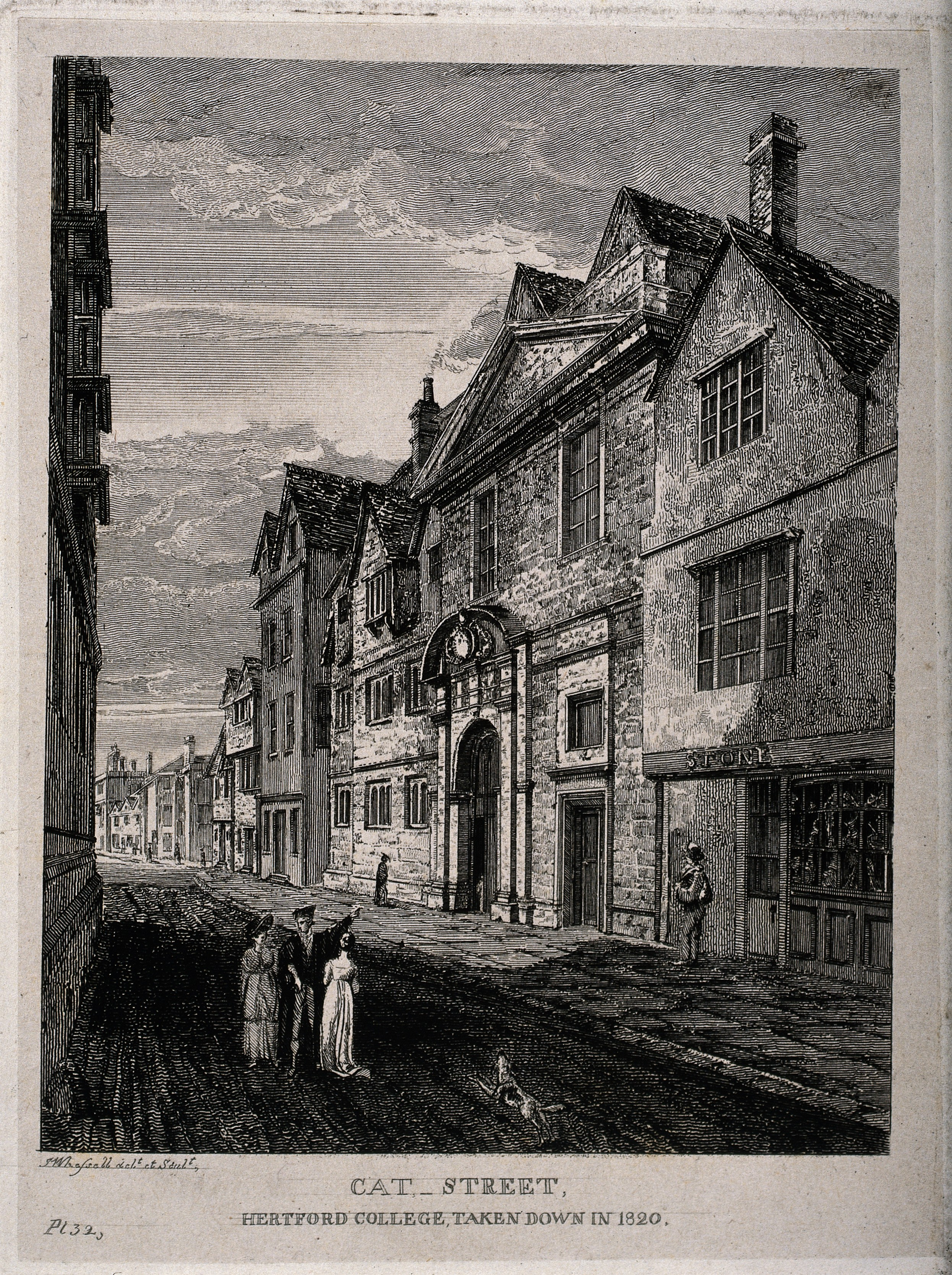
The Catte Street gate, before 1820

Hart Hall expanded and new buildings were put up. In the early 17th century, the current Senior Common Room was built as lodgings for the principal. From this period also, the main entrance of the hall moved from being a narrow passage off New College Lane to a gate on Catte Street. By the late 17th century, Cat Hall is described as being used as 'the ball-court of Hart Hall'. In the latter part of the 17th century, the principal, William Thornton, provided a proper gate for the Catte Street entrance of the hall, and decorated with a device of a drinking hart with the motto Sicut cervus anhelat ad fontes aquarum ('As the hart panteth after the water brooks', taken from Psalm 42, verse 1, but in a peculiar translation). Although the current gatehouse is not Thornton's original, it retains the design and motto, and houses the original decorated gates. It has been suggested that this frieze with its Latin motto is the real counterpart of the one translated for the waiting crowd by the title character of Thomas Hardy's Jude the Obscure.

Hertford College specialises in both Irish studies and Irish history. Hertford has long been associated with Ireland and can trace its connections back to the 16th century, when Irish Roman Catholics and Irish Protestants studied alongside each other at Hart Hall, one of the few places at Oxford that admitted Roman Catholics at the time.

In 1692, the political satirist Jonathan Swift was incorporated from Trinity College Dublin, on the books of Hart Hall to receive his MA.

==== Richard Newton's Hertford College ====
On 28 July 1710, the Rev Richard Newton was admitted principal of Hart Hall. Newton was a well-connected, energetic, educational reformer. He was appointed principal from 'a very peaceful retirement' as Rector of Sudborough, where he was personal tutor to two brothers, who were both destined to be prime minister — Thomas Pelham-Holles and Henry Pelham — bringing the younger with him to Hart Hall. He dedicated himself to raising the hall from debt and securing a firmer financial endowment. Newton planned to redesign the hall around a proper quadrangle, with a tutor, or angler, and students living in each angle, and common buildings along the sides. However, only two buildings in his design were ever built: one angle in the south-east corner of the Old Quadrangle (nowadays known as the Cottage), and his simple stone Chapel on the south side (consecrated 25 November 1716), which now serves as the college's Library. These buildings were financed entirely from Newton's pocket, to the sum of around £2000 (around £355,000 adjusted for inflation).

In 1720, Newton published his Scheme of Disciplines laying out his scheme of education with a view to obtaining a charter of incorporation, and, on 18 May 1723, he presented his petition for a charter. The proposal met immediate opposition, especially from Exeter College, exercising its old rights, and All Souls, desiring to expand northward onto the hall's land. In addition, the appointments of principals for the various halls had established itself in a game of promotion, and a few would-be principals opposed the plan. John Conybeare, then a Fellow of Exeter, and later Bishop of Bristol, was Newton's most ardent opponent, penning the book Calumny Refuted against Newton's reforms. After years of struggle, Richard Newton's statutes were accepted on 3 November 1739, and the charter incorporating 'the Principal and Fellows of Hertford College' (Principalis et Socii Collegii Hertfordiensis) was received on 8 September 1740.

Newton's Hertford was a relatively spartan college, having received no real endowment. Meals were simple and cheap, and the principal insisted on eating the same as everyone else. Students were expected to work hard, and, where Newton found the university's education lacking, he supplemented it with disputations within the college. Newton allowed gentlemen-commoners to matriculate at the college, but they paid double fees for the same accommodation and food as the others. They were originally allowed to wear their coloured gowns and tufted caps, but Newton eventually made them wear the ordinary black gown. Thus, many a well-to-do family sent their sons to Hertford College to instil in them some disciplined education, unlike the privileged wining and dining had by gentlemen-commoners in other colleges.

==== Decline and dissolution ====
Transfer of Stock of Hertford College Act 1816
- Act of Parliament
- Parliament of the United Kingdom
- Long title: An Act to authorize such Person as His Majesty shall appoint to transfer a certain Sum in Three Pounds per Cent. Reduced Annuities, now standing in the Name of the dissolved College of Hertford, in the University of Oxford; and also to receive Dividends due upon such Annuities.
- Citation: 56 Geo. 3. c. 95
- Territorial extent: United Kingdom

Dates
- Royal assent: 26 June 1816
- Commencement: 26 June 1816 (Note: The Acts of Parliament (Commencement) Act 1793.)
- Repealed: 5 August 1873
Other legislation
Repealed by	Statute Law Revision Act 1873

Status: Repealed

Text of statute as originally enacted

After Richard Newton's death in 1753, the principalship of the college fell to a succession of men mostly lacking the desire or energy to continue their predecessor's plan. One exception to this succession was David Durell, who built up the reputation and academic success of the college. Under Durell, the future statesman Charles James Fox matriculated in 1764 (Hertford, unusually for Oxford, was a Whig college). However, the scheme of four tutors in their respective angles was reduced to two, and cheaper junior fellows took over some of the burden of tutoring. It was at Hertford that the tutor Benjamin Blayney prepared his 1769 Standard Edition of the Authorized King James Version of the Bible. Apart from Durell's principalship, the college went into decline due to the mismanagement of uninterested principals and the lack of decent endowments. In May 1805, Bernard Hodgson, last principal of Hertford College died, and no suitable successor could be found and agreed upon. By 1810, matriculation had ceased, and the last students were awarded their degrees. The last tutor and vice-principal, Richard Hewitt, continued to live in his rooms without students until May 1816, when a commission declared Hertford College dissolved.

=== Magdalen Hall and the second Hertford College ===
==== Magdalen Hall ====
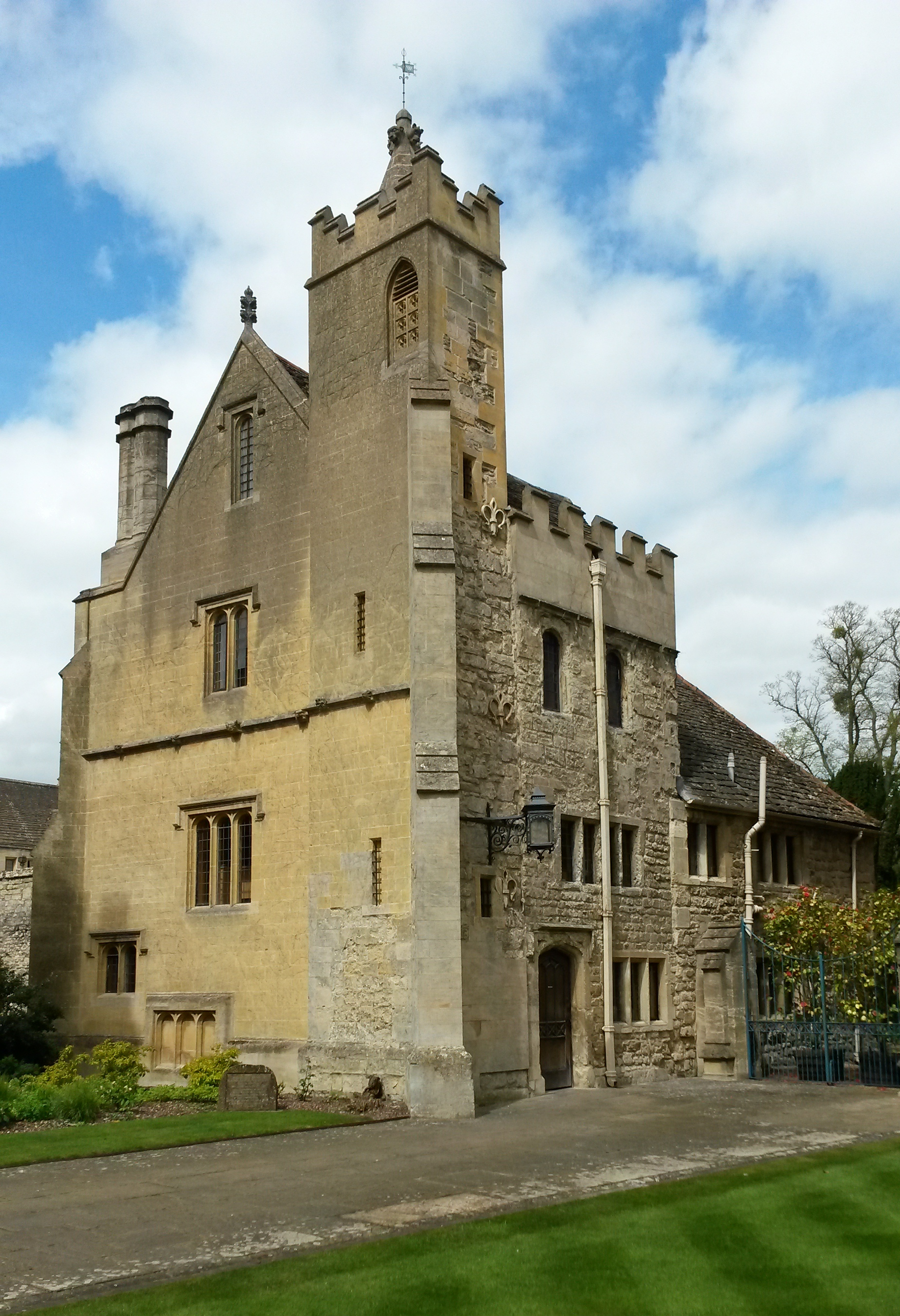
The Old Grammar Hall, Magdalen College, part of the original Magdalen Hall site

Magdalen Hall was founded around 1490 on a site to the west of Magdalen College and next to Magdalen's grammar school. The site is now Magdalen's St Swithun's quadrangle. It took the name of an earlier Magdalen Hall in the High Street, which was founded by William Waynflete in 1448 and then closed on the opening of Magdalen College in 1458. The first master of the grammar school was appointed in 1480, and its original school building was erected in 1486. However, as the hall took independent students as well as those belonging to the college, it quickly became an independent institution under its own principal.

The hall was known for its adherence to the teachings of John Wycliffe; William Tyndale, translator of the English Bible and martyr, studied there. Another famous student of the hall was the political philosopher Thomas Hobbes, who came up in either 1601 or 1602. At the English Civil War, Magdalen Hall was known as a Puritan hall under the principalship of Henry Wilkinson. Famous Puritan graduates include Philip Nye, key adviser to Oliver Cromwell on matters of religion and regulation of the Church. The hall rarely used a badge of arms, but, when it did, it used the same arms as the college.

At the time of the demise of the first Hertford College, Magdalen College had long been searching for a way of expelling Magdalen Hall in order to expand into its buildings. Before the demise of Hertford, Magdalen College conspired to make its site ready to receive a transplanted Magdalen Hall. The current Lodge of Hertford College thus still bears the arms of Magdalen Hall (and so also of Magdalen College) beside those of Hertford College (and Hart Hall) and the university.

==== Move to Catte Street ====
Lands of Hertford College Act 1816
- Act of Parliament
- Parliament of the United Kingdom
- Long title: An act to enable His Majesty to grant certain Lands, Tenements and Hereditaments, escheated and devolved to His Majesty by the Dissolution of Hertford College, in the University of Oxford, and the Site of the said College and Buildings thereon, to the Chancellor, Masters and Scholars of the said University, in Trust for the Principal and other Members of Magdalen Hall, for the Purpose of their removing to such Site; and to enable the said Chancellor, Masters and Scholars of the said University, and the President and Scholars of Saint Mary Magdalen College, to do all necessary Acts for such Removal.
- Citation: 56 Geo. 3. c. 136
- Territorial extent: United Kingdom

Dates
- Royal assent: 1 July 1816
- Commencement: 1 July 1816
- Repealed: 31 July 1978
Other legislation
Repealed by	Statute Law (Repeals) Act 1978

Status: Repealed

Text of statute as originally enacted

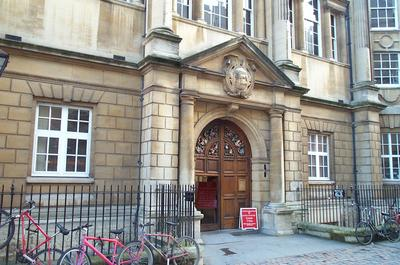
Entrance building, constructed for Magdalen Hall in the 1820s

John Macbride became both principal of Magdalen Hall and Lord Almoner's Professor of Arabic in 1813, and plans to move the hall to the site of Hertford College were already afoot. On 15 March 1815, Magdalen College submitted a proposal for the move to Convocation. Magdalen College proposed to repair the Hertford buildings and defray the expense of Magdalen Hall's move to the site, while the hall were to relinquish claim to their own buildings to Magdalen College. An Act of Parliament was passed supporting the plan, but no move was made until a fire accidentally started by an undergraduate on 9 January 1820 destroyed almost half of Magdalen Hall's buildings. Not long after this, one of Hertford College's buildings on Catte Street, so flimsy that it was known as the 'paper building', collapsed. With this motivation, the new foundation stone of Magdalen Hall was laid at the new site on 3 May 1820, and the hall's migration was complete by 1822. The Catte Street frontage was pulled down and rebuilt, and several buildings had an extra storey added to them. Magdalen Hall expanded to fill the space, and became the largest hall by far, numbering 214 members in 1846. Macbride and his vice-principals were active in building up the refounded Magdalen Hall. To distance the hall from its namesake college, Macbride attempted to change the name to 'Magdalene Hall', but this change was never accepted. Macbride served as principal for 54 years, until his death in 1868. The Macbride Sermon, one of the University Sermons, is preached each Hilary term in the Chapel of Hertford College in his memory.

==== Refounding of Hertford College ====
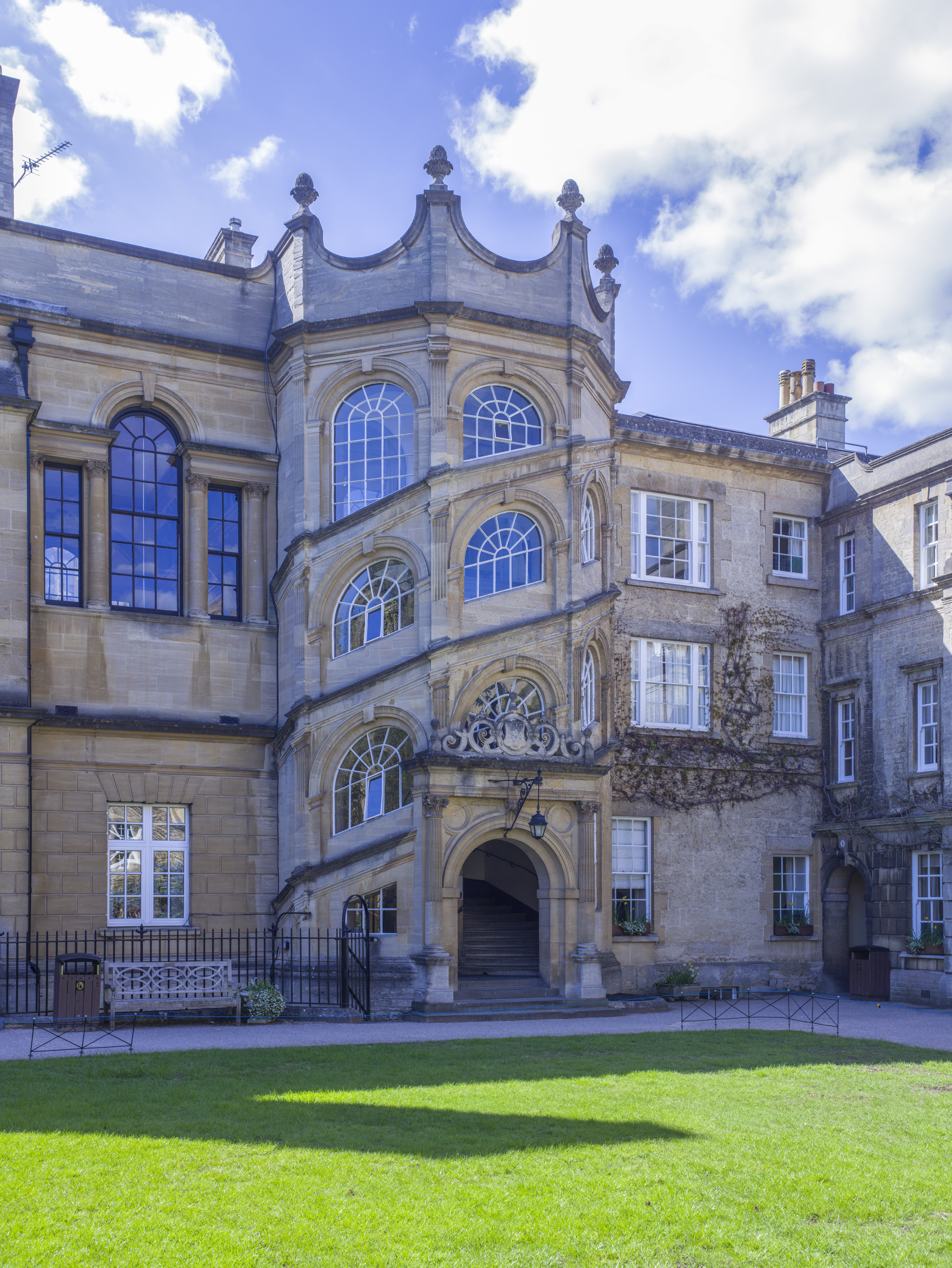
North-west corner of the Old Quad of Hertford College, showing the spiral staircase to the Hall

Hertford College Act 1874 (Note: Section 1.)
- Act of Parliament
- Parliament of the United Kingdom
- Long title: An Act for dissolving Magdalen Hall, in the University of Oxford, and for incorporating the Principal, Fellows, and Scholars of Hertford College; and for vesting in such College the lands and other property now held in trust for the benefit of Magdalen Hall.
- Citation: 37 & 38 Vict. c. 55
- Territorial extent: United Kingdom

Dates
- Royal assent: 7 August 1874
- Commencement: 7 August 1874

Status: Current legislation

Text of statute as originally enacted

During John Macbride's principalship it became clear that the growing, energetic Magdalen Hall should be incorporated as a college to match its academic standing in the university. Since the name "Magdalen College" was already taken, the favoured option was the revival of "Hertford College". Macbride was succeeded as principal in 1868 by his vice-principal, Richard Michell, who brought a bill before Parliament in 1873 for the incorporation of Magdalen Hall as Hertford College. The bill received significant financial support from Thomas Charles Baring, then newly elected MP for South Essex. Baring had been a Fellow of Brasenose College, and had offered a substantial endowment of fellowships and scholarships to that college, but it had been refused, because Brasenose rejected his conditions of restricting the funds to members of the Church of England. However, to ease the passage of the bill, Baring removed his condition to the first instalment of the endowment (subsequent instalments were restricted), and Magdalen Hall was incorporated as "the Principal, Fellows, and Scholars of Hertford College" (Principalis, Socii, et Scholastici Collegii Hertfordiensis) on 7 August 1874. Thus, Michell became the last principal of Magdalen Hall and the first principal of the refounded Hertford College.

Baring bought a house across New College Lane from the college to serve as fellows' lodgings (at some point the house was named Clarendon House), which was the first move of the college onto the northern side of New College Lane. That was soon followed by the purchase of other houses on that side of the road, which were collectively known as Ædes, and the old Chapel of Our Lady at Smithgate, which is now the Octagon, housing the Middle Common Room. Also during that period, a gatehouse was built on the Catte Street frontage and the old doors were reinstalled there. A new dining hall was built above the gatehouse, and much of the northern side of the Old Quadrangle, apart from Old Hall, was rebuilt.

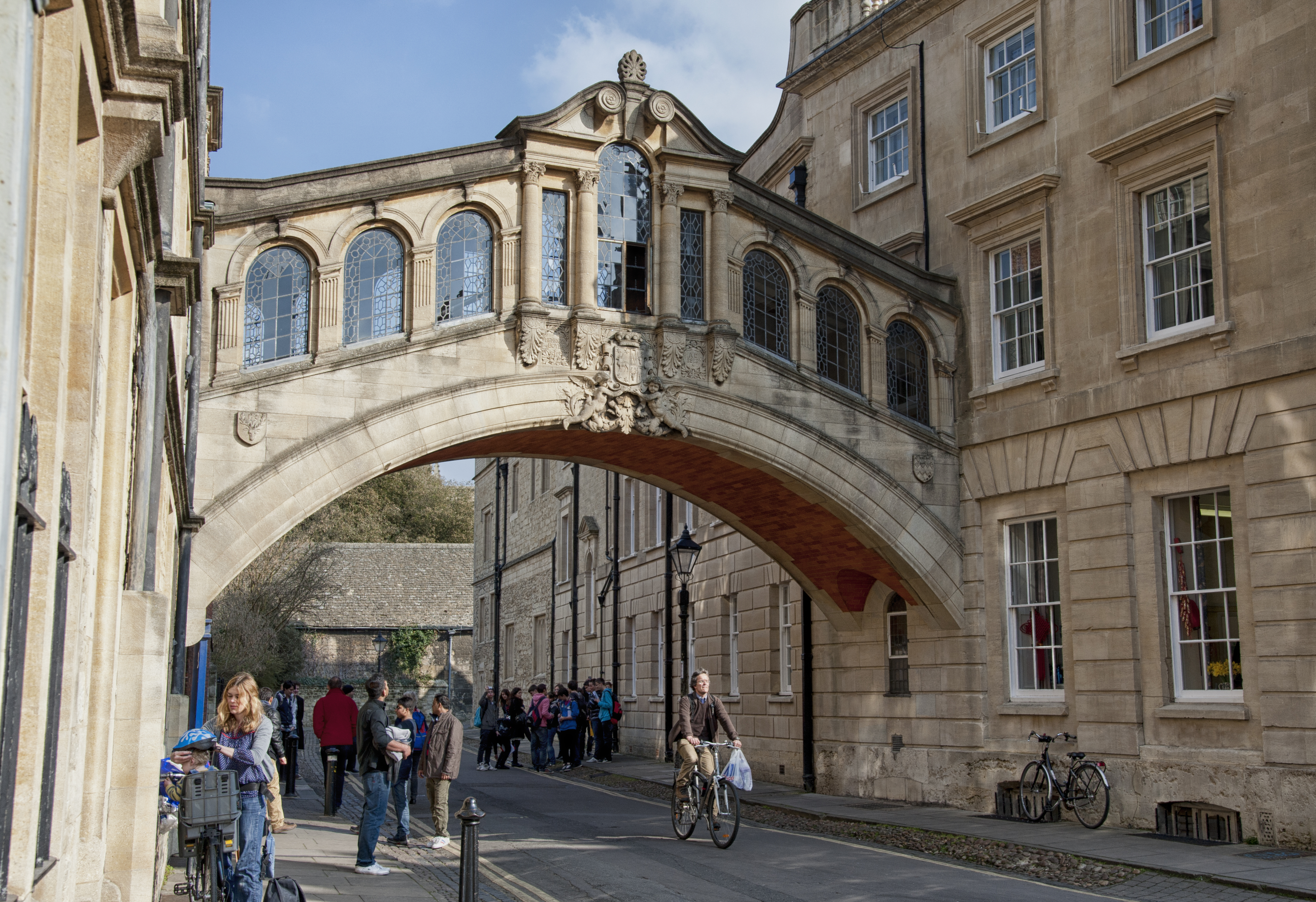
Bridge of Sighs

In 1877, Henry Boyd succeeded Michell, becoming the second principal of the refounded Hertford College. His energy, good connections and longevity created the modern college as it is today. Boyd's name appears carved on the landmark Bridge of Sighs, and he is commemorated by a memorial in the Chapel (to the left of the chancel) and a portrait in the Hall (at the west end of High Table). Boyd's partnership with the architect Thomas Graham Jackson brought about the expansion of the college and its endowment with its iconic "Anglo-Jackson" buildings. In 1887, Jackson began work on the Gatehouse, the Hall and its spiral staircase, and the north range of the Old Quad. In 1901, Jackson started building the college's site on the northern side of New College Lane. By 1908, he had completed a new Chapel, which he declared to be his favourite work. Eventually, after much opposition, he built the Bridge of Sighs, linking the Old and New Quads across New College Lane in 1913.

In the two world wars, a total of 171 members of Hertford College died. Those of World War I are commemorated by a memorial on the south wall of the chancel in the Chapel, while those of World War II are remembered in a memorial in the portico, to the right of the Chapel door. Notable among them is Major Percy Nugent FitzPatrick, son of James Percy FitzPatrick, who was killed near Cambrai on 14 December 1917. It was with the death of his son that James Percy FitzPatrick made the suggestion, after the war's end, to keep a two-minute silence each year on Armistice Day.

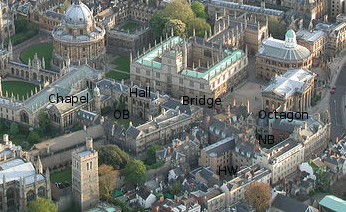
Aerial photograph of Oxford with Hertford College marked: showing the 3 quads (Old Buildings, New Buildings and Holywell), the Chapel, Hall, Bridge and Octagon

In 1922, the novelist Evelyn Waugh came up to Hertford, famously feuding with his history tutor C. R. M. F. Cruttwell (who was to become the fourth principal of the refounded college, 1930–1939), and later naming a number of odious characters after him. Waugh wrote of his time at Hertford, "I do no work here and never go to Chapel". He novelised his time at Oxford in Brideshead Revisited, having his protagonist Charles Ryder at Hertford.

Starting from 1965, Hertford made a special effort to encourage applicants from state schools through the Hertford Scheme, established by Physics Fellow Neil Tanner, under which candidates were interviewed early, outside the standard application process, and could be offered a place at the college without having to sit the university entrance exam. That had the effect of dramatically raising academic standards within the college, and other colleges introduced similar initiatives. Today, around 70% of undergraduate students at the college come from UK state schools. The percentage of individuals from state schools (out of all UK applicants/students) is higher than at most Oxford colleges. The commitment to diversity is in keeping with Hertford's earlier history of openness: in 1907 Hertford admitted the first African-American Rhodes Scholar, Alain Leroy Locke, after he had been refused by several other colleges.

Geoffrey Warnock served as the 9th Principal of the refounded college from 1971 until 1988. He presided over the latest period of growth, and established the college's leftist credentials. In 1974, Hertford became one of the first five co-educational colleges in the university (the others being Brasenose, Jesus College, St Catherine's, and Wadham). The college now has an almost equal gender balance, with slight variations from year to year. In memory of Warnock, the college named a student-accommodation building near Folly Bridge after him. He also has a memorial in the Chapel, and a portrait behind High Table in the Hall.

== Buildings ==
Hertford College's main site is situated on Catte Street, New College Lane and Holywell Street. The site consists of three quadrangles: Old Quadrangle, New Quadrangle, and Holywell Quadrangle. The college also has three large groups of buildings for student accommodation near Folly Bridge: Warnock House, the Graduate Centre and Abingdon House. In addition to these, the college owns a number of houses around Oxford.

=== Old Quadrangle ===
The Old Quadrangle (known as Old Quad or OB Quad, for Old Buildings) is, as the name suggests, the oldest and the original quadrangle. Its entrance is the through the Gatehouse on Catte Street, directly opposite the main gates of the Bodleian Library. The Gatehouse is a late 19th-century building by Thomas Graham Jackson, bearing the image of a drinking hart above the archway. However, the wooden doors with their colourful floral decoration are the gates of Hart Hall from the 17th century. The Gatehouse houses the Lodge.

Through the Gatehouse, the quadrangle is laid out around a pleasant lawn with a few decorative trees. The lawn is off-limits during Michaelmas and Hilary terms but is accessible during Trinity term for sitting on (at any time) and croquet (on Fridays and Sundays only).

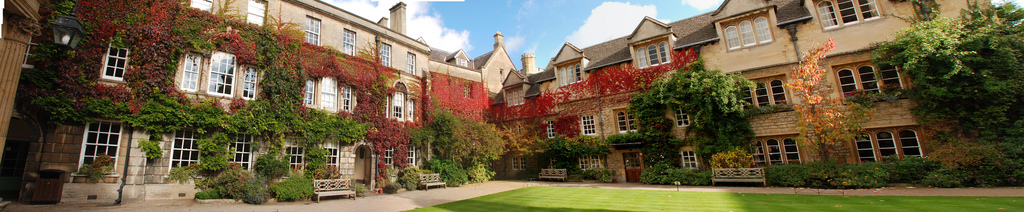
North-east corner of the Old Quad of Hertford College, showing, from left to right, the Bursary, the Old Hall, the Old Library and the Senior Common Room

In the north-east corner of the quad is the Old Hall, the oldest remaining buildings of Hart Hall, dating from the 1570s. The Old Hall and its adjoining Buttery are now in regular use for dining, especially by the Fellows. Running southwards, along the eastern side of the quad, is a 17th-century building, with oriel windows tucked away on its southern end. Originally, the portion closest to the Old Hall was student accommodation, and the southern portion was the principal's lodgings. Today the building is mostly taken over by the Senior Common Room, with the northern ground-floor room being the Old Library. In the south-east corner is the 18th-century Cottage, the only one of the planned four 'angles' of Dr Newton that was ever built. Originally, this occupied the entire corner, around to what was the chapel (and is now the library). Its southern side was demolished to make way for Jackson's Chapel.

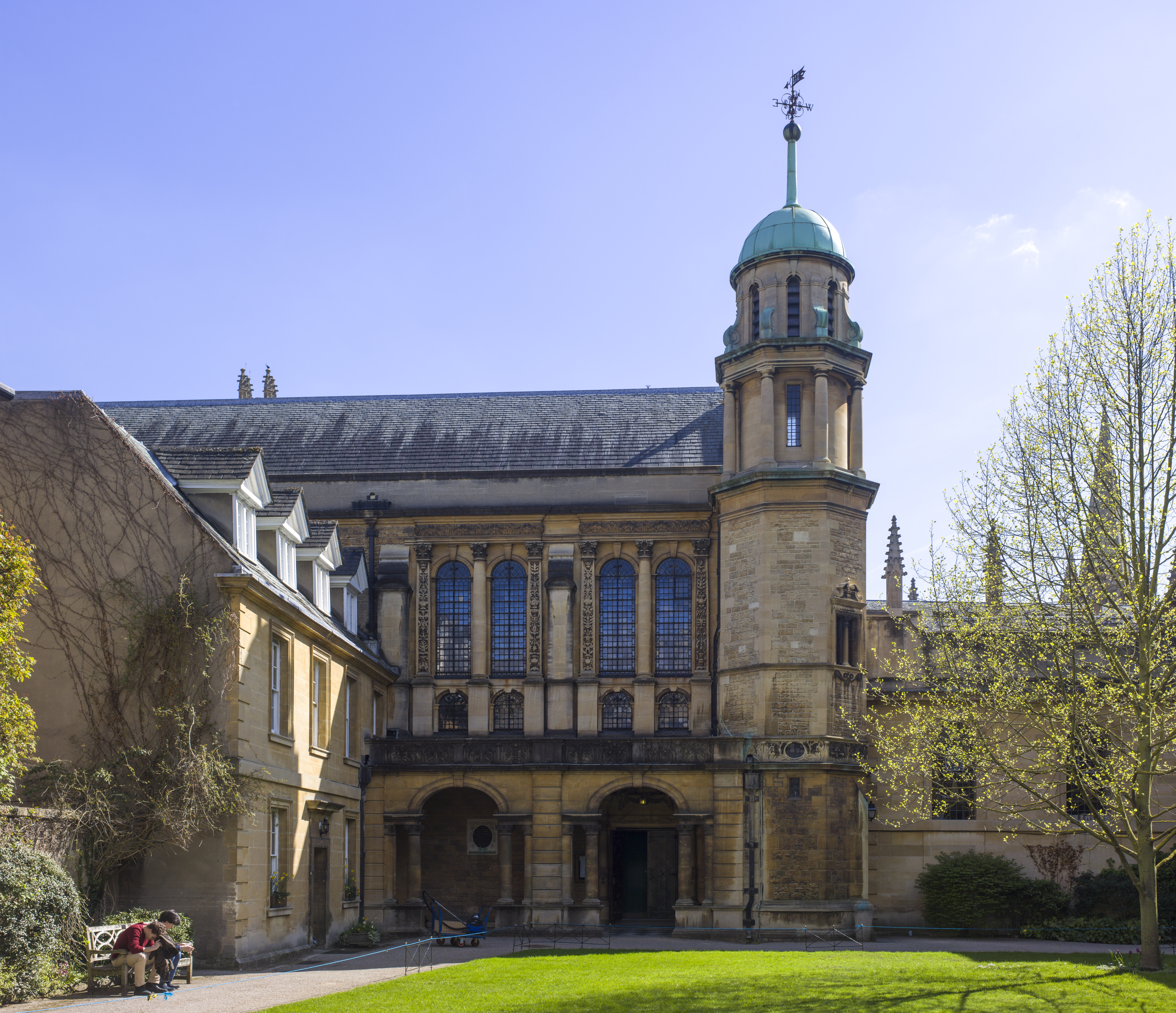
South-east corner of the Old Quad of Hertford College, showing, from left to right, Dr Newton's Angle, T. G. Jackson's Chapel, and (partially obscured) the Library

The southern side of the quad consists of the Chapel, built in 1908 by Jackson, which has a particularly good acoustic. Its ante-chapel houses a stained-glass window depicting William Tyndale, made in 1911 for the British and Foreign Bible Society, and installed at Hertford in 1994. West of the Chapel is the Library, which was the previous chapel built in the 18th century by Newton. The Library possesses many fine, antique books, most of which belonged to the library of Magdalen Hall. Among these are many rare 17th-century manuscripts and an original edition of Thomas Hobbes's Leviathan given as a personal gift to the college: Hobbes prepared this work while at Magdalen Hall.

The western side of the quad has the Gatehouse, with the Lodge, in its centre. On either side of this are slightly earlier buildings, the southern of which is the Principal's Lodgings, and the northern mostly houses the college's offices. In addition, the north-west building has access onto the Bridge of Sighs. Above the Gatehouse is the dining Hall, which is wood-panelled and hung with a number of college portraits. The hall is reached from the quad by a distinctive stone spiral staircase designed by Jackson, and inspired by the spiral staircase at the Château de Blois.

The northern side of the quad consists of a building by Jackson, much of which now houses the Bursary. The building is infamous as the site of the incident novelised in Evelyn Waugh's Brideshead Revisited in which Sebastian Flyte, returning from a Bullingdon Club bender vomits through a window into a ground-floor room.

=== New Quadrangle ===
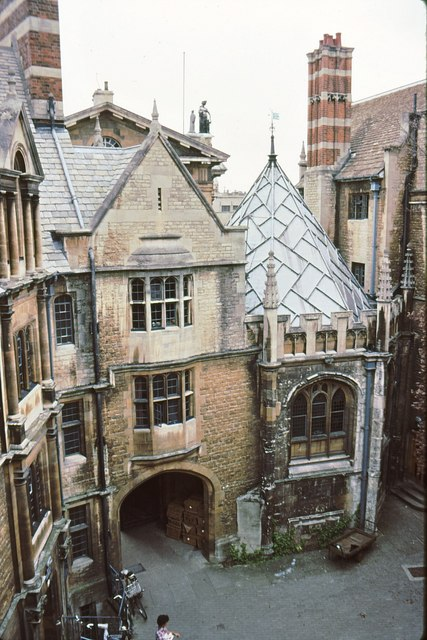
The New Buildings Gatehouse and the Octagon as seen from inside the quad. The Clarendon Building can be seen in the background.

The New Quadrangle (known as New Quad or NB Quad, for New Buildings) is connected to the Old Quadrangle, across New College Lane, by the Bridge of Sighs, which was designed by Thomas Graham Jackson. The north-western corner of New Quad is taken up by the Indian Institute building, which is not part of Hertford College. Most of the New Buildings are early 20th-century designs by Jackson, except the slightly later frontage onto Holywell Street by T. H. Hughes, on the northern side of the quad. The quad is entered through a gate onto Catte Street, just opposite the Clarendon Building. New Quad is mostly used for undergraduate accommodation.

The most significant building in the quad is the Octagon, just north of the gate on Catte Street, which houses the Middle Common Room. It is the 16th-century Chapel of St Mary the Virgin at Smithgate, which formed a bastion in the town walls. An original carving of the scene of the Annunciation can be seen from Catte Street, just beside the gate.

=== Holywell Quadrangle ===
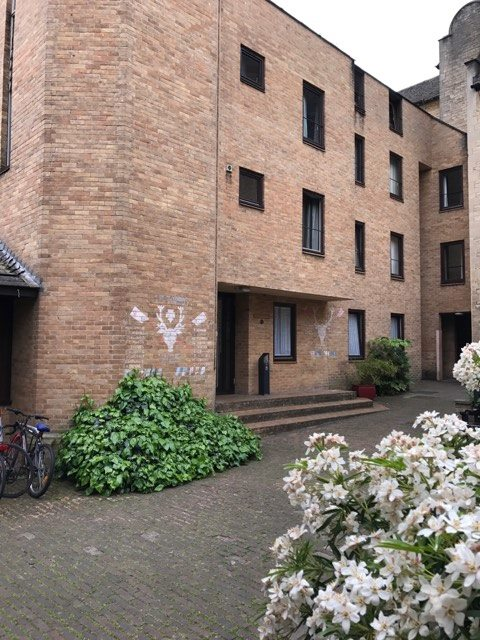
Hertford College - Holywell Quadrangle

Holywell Quadrangle backs directly onto New Quad, and the two are connected by an arched corridor that also contains the steps down to Hertford's subterranean bar. Holywell Quad was built in 1975, and is almost exclusively for first-year undergraduate housing. Its main features are a gate onto Holywell Street, the Junior Common Room in the south-east corner, and the Baring Room (named after Thomas Charles Baring, the college's major benefactor) which is a multi-purpose hall at the top of the southern staircase.

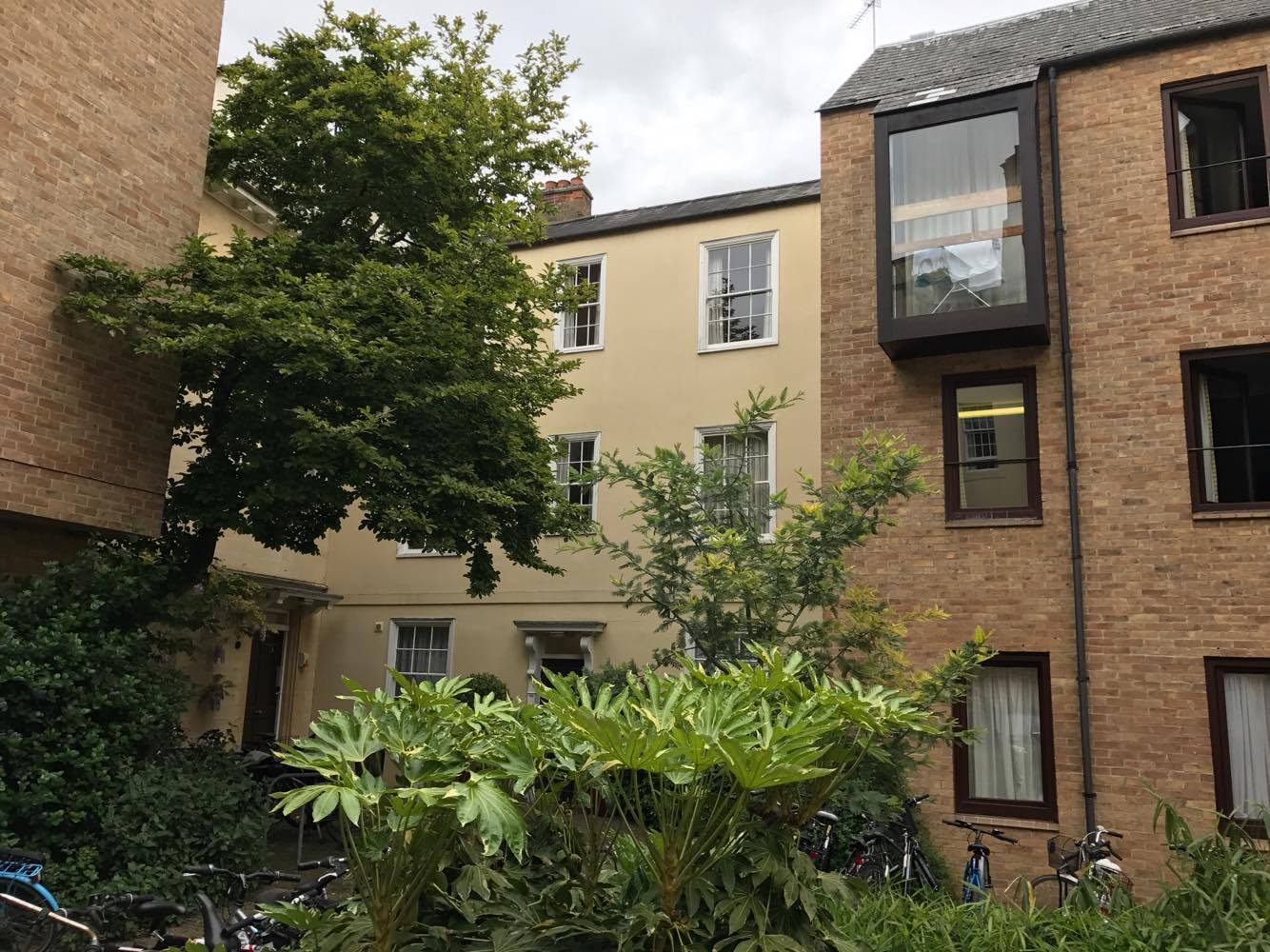
Hertford College - Holywell Quadrangle

== Student life ==
Undergraduate students are accommodated for the full three or four years of their study, either on the main site or on college-owned property primarily in North Oxford and the Folly Bridge area. A new Hertford Graduate Centre fronting the Isis was built near Folly Bridge and was opened in 2000.

Hertford is home to a college cat named Simpkin, who lives in the College Lodge and is the fourth of his lineage, collectively Simpkins, the collective noun for Hertford College cats; the original was called Simpkin and was introduced by the former college principal Geoffrey Warnock, named after the cat in the Beatrix Potter novel The Tailor of Gloucester. He is provided with a bursary by alumni to cover his food and veterinary treatment.

=== Academic selection ===
Hertford has one of the lowest admission rates in Oxbridge.

=== Academic achievement ===
Hertford's exam results are slightly above average. In the Norrington Table of results over the period 2006–2012 it has come 17th, 9th, 18th, 6th, 12th, 5th and 23rd.

=== Sport ===
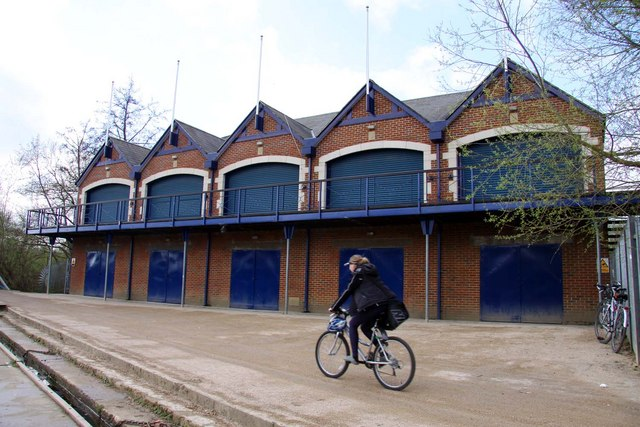
Hertford College Boathouse at Longbridges on the Isis

Hertford College Boat Club is among the leading Oxford college boat clubs: both its women's and men's first boats are in the first division of Torpids and Eights Week, with both M1 and W1 winning "blades" in the 2015 edition of Torpids. The boats and club room are in the Longbridges boathouse on the Isis. With the transition of Magdalen Hall to Hertford College in 1874, the old blue-black of the hall stopped racing in 1873, and the new red-white of the college took to the river in 1875. Within only seven years of its refoundation, the college came Head of the River in the annual college boat races, in 1881. On achieving that victory, the crew carried their boat all the way back to the college and burnt it just inside the gates. The college archives possess a letter detailing the club's celebrations from the sub-librarian of the Bodleian Library, who spent the night on the scaffolding surrounding the work on the Old Schools Tower, directly opposite the Hertford gate, in case the fire spread to the library. In 2005, the boathouse was gutted by an arson attack carried out by the Animal Liberation Front, in protest against animal testing at the university. The new boathouse was rebuilt on the same site.

The college was endowed with a new gym in 2011 and has playing fields in New Marston, which include a pavilion with facilities for most major team sports. In August 2013 Hertford College Rugby Club became the first team from the UK to tour Mongolia in official partnership with the Mongolian Rugby Football Union. They played matches against The Mongolia Defense University and the Ulaan Baatar Warriors. Both matches were played in the national stadium and broadcast live on Mongolian national television. In 2017, the team returned to Mongolia, this time playing two matches against the Ulaanbaatar Warriors.

=== Music ===
Hertford College has the largest and most active music society of any Oxford college, drawing in musicians from around the university, with ensembles including the Hertford College Orchestra, the Hertford College Chapel Choir, the Hertford College Wind Band, the Hertford College Jazz Band and the Hertford College Bruckner Orchestra. There are two competitive organ scholarships. The Chapel's fine acoustic lends itself to concerts and recitals, and it is frequently used for recording.

== People associated with the college ==
=== Principals ===
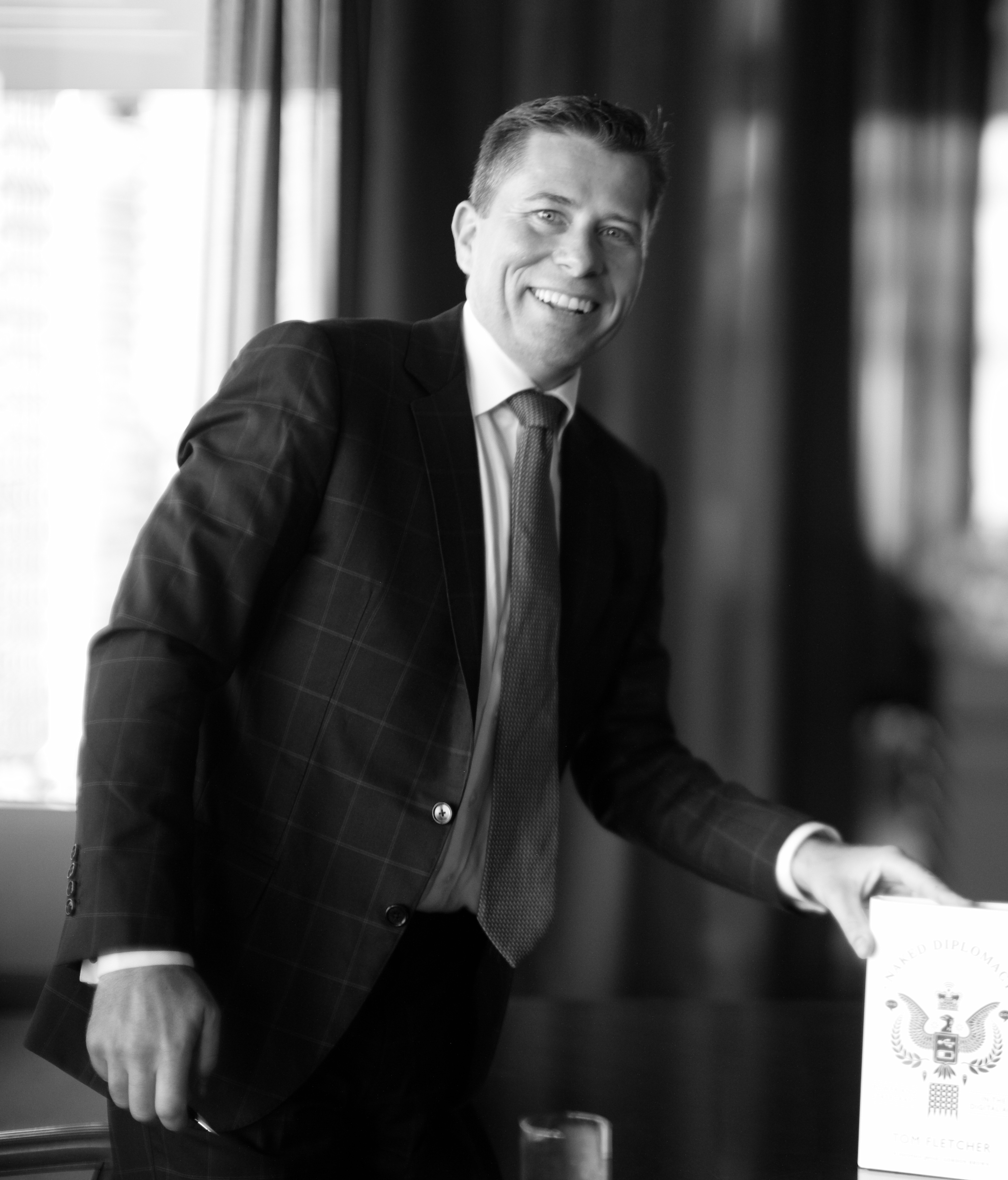
Tom Fletcher, most recent Principal of the college

The most recent permanent Principal of the college, from 2020 until November 2024, was former UK Ambassador to Lebanon and foreign policy advisor Tom Fletcher. Professor Patrick Roche is the current interim Principal.

=== Selected current Professorial and Tutorial Fellows ===
The college has over 30 Tutorial Fellows in the subjects it offers at undergraduate level.

- Hagan Bayley, Professor of Chemical Biology
- Charlotte Brewer, Professor of English Language and Literature, Tutor in English
- Dame Kay Davies, FRS, Dr Lee's Professor of Anatomy
- Martin C. J. Maiden, Professor of Molecular Epidemiology, Tutor in Biology
- Ian McBride, Foster Professor of Irish History
- Peter Millican, Gilbert Ryle Fellow, Professor and Tutor in Philosophy
- Christopher J. Schofield, Professor of Organic Chemistry
- Emma J. Smith, Professor of Shakespeare Studies, Tutor in English
- David Ian Stuart, Professor of Structural Biology
- David Thomas, Professor of Geography
- Claire Vallance, Professor of Physical Chemistry, Tutor in Chemistry
- Michael Wooldridge, Professor of Computer Science
- Alison Woollard, Associate Professor in Genetics, Tutor in Biochemistry
- David Hopkin (historian), Professor of European Social History

=== Emeritus Fellows ===
The college has a number of Emeritus Fellows, including:

- Toby Barnard, historian
- Martin Biddle, archaeologist
- Robin Devenish, former professor and Tutor in Physics
- Fionn Dunne, former Dean and Fellow in Engineering
- Bill MacMillan, former Pro-Vice-Chancellor and Senior Tutor
- Tom Paulin, former G M Young Lecturer and Tutor in English
- Christopher Tyerman, former Professor of History of the Crusades and Tutor in History
- Alison Young, former Professor of Public Law

Former Emeritus and Emerita Fellows include Rebecca Sitsapesan, Anthony Cockshut, E. M. Vaughan Williams, R. W. Guillery, Philip Randle, Felix Markham, C. A. J. Armstrong, Jean Gottmann and Julia Briggs. Briggs was the college's first woman fellow, in 1978.

=== Honorary Fellows ===
- John Baring, 7th Baron Ashburton
- Walter Bodmer, former principal
- Martin Bridson, mathematician
- Nancee Oku Bright, documentary filmmaker, director and producer
- Sherard Cowper-Coles
- John Dewar, former Tutor in Law
- Richard W. Fisher, ambassador
- R. F. Foster, historian
- Andrew Goudie, Master of St Cross College
- Charlotte Hogg, economist
- Will Hutton, economist and former Principal
- The Very Reverend Jeffrey John, Dean of St Albans
- Sir Jeffrey Jowell QC, barrister
- Soweto Kinch, jazz musician and rapper
- John Landers, former principal
- Paul Manduca, chairman of Prudential plc (2012-2020)
- The Rt. Rev. Thomas McMahon, Catholic Bishop of Brentwood
- Paul Muldoon, President of the Poetry Society
- David Pannick, Baron Pannick
- Mary Robinson, former President of Ireland
- Jacqui Smith, former Home Secretary
- Stephanie West, classical scholar
- General Roger Wheeler, former Chief of the General Staff
- Athol Williams, poet and applied philosopher
- Tobias Wolff, author

=== Hart Hall and the first Hertford College (1282–1816) ===
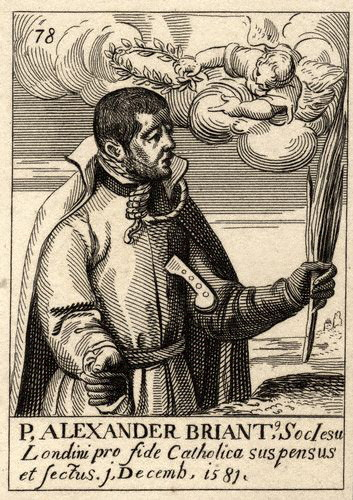
Saint Alexander Briant

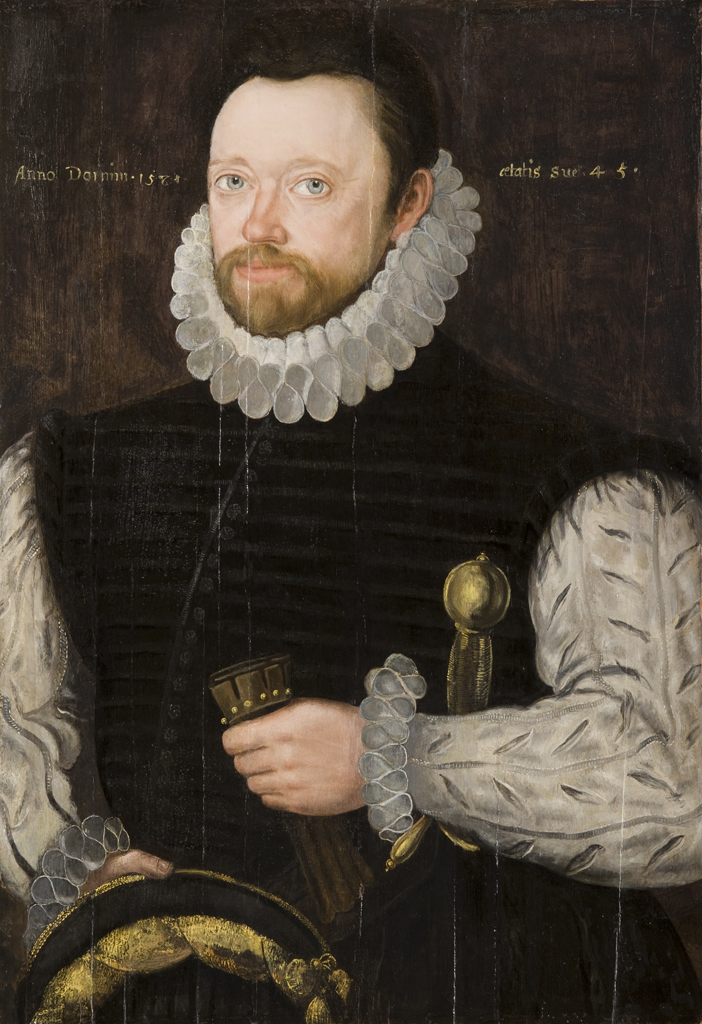
Reginald Scot

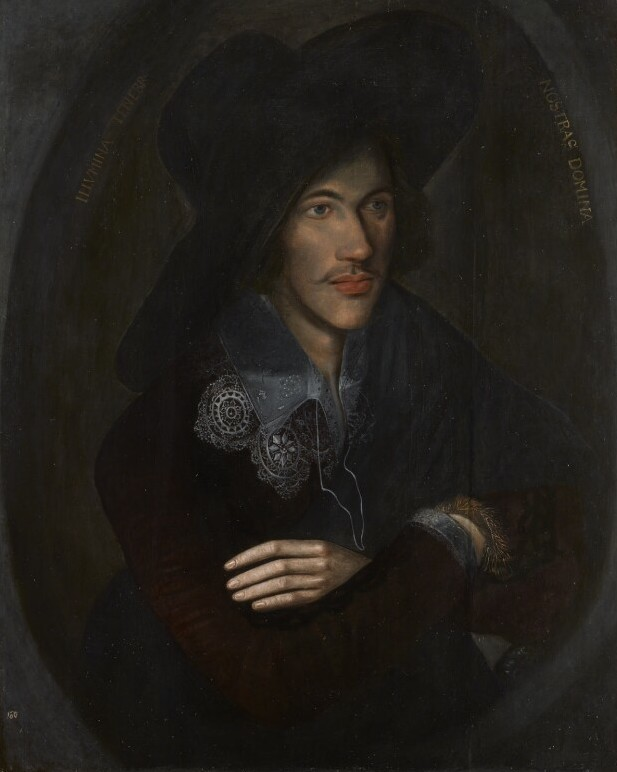
John Donne

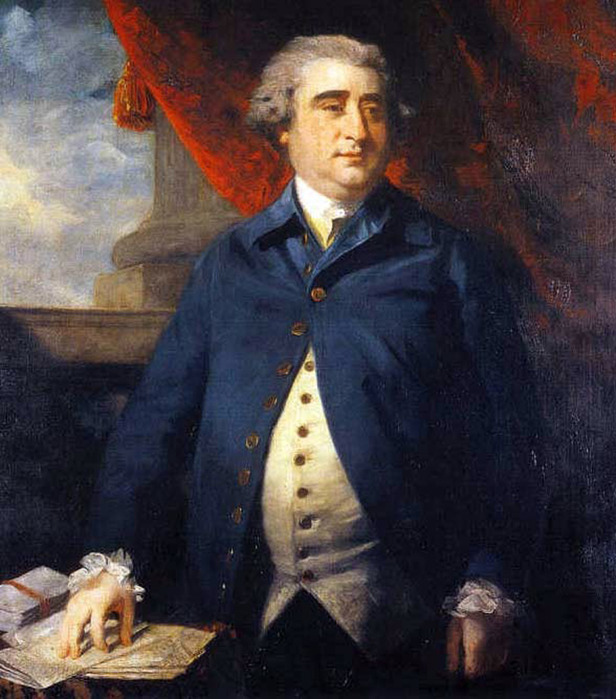
Charles James Fox

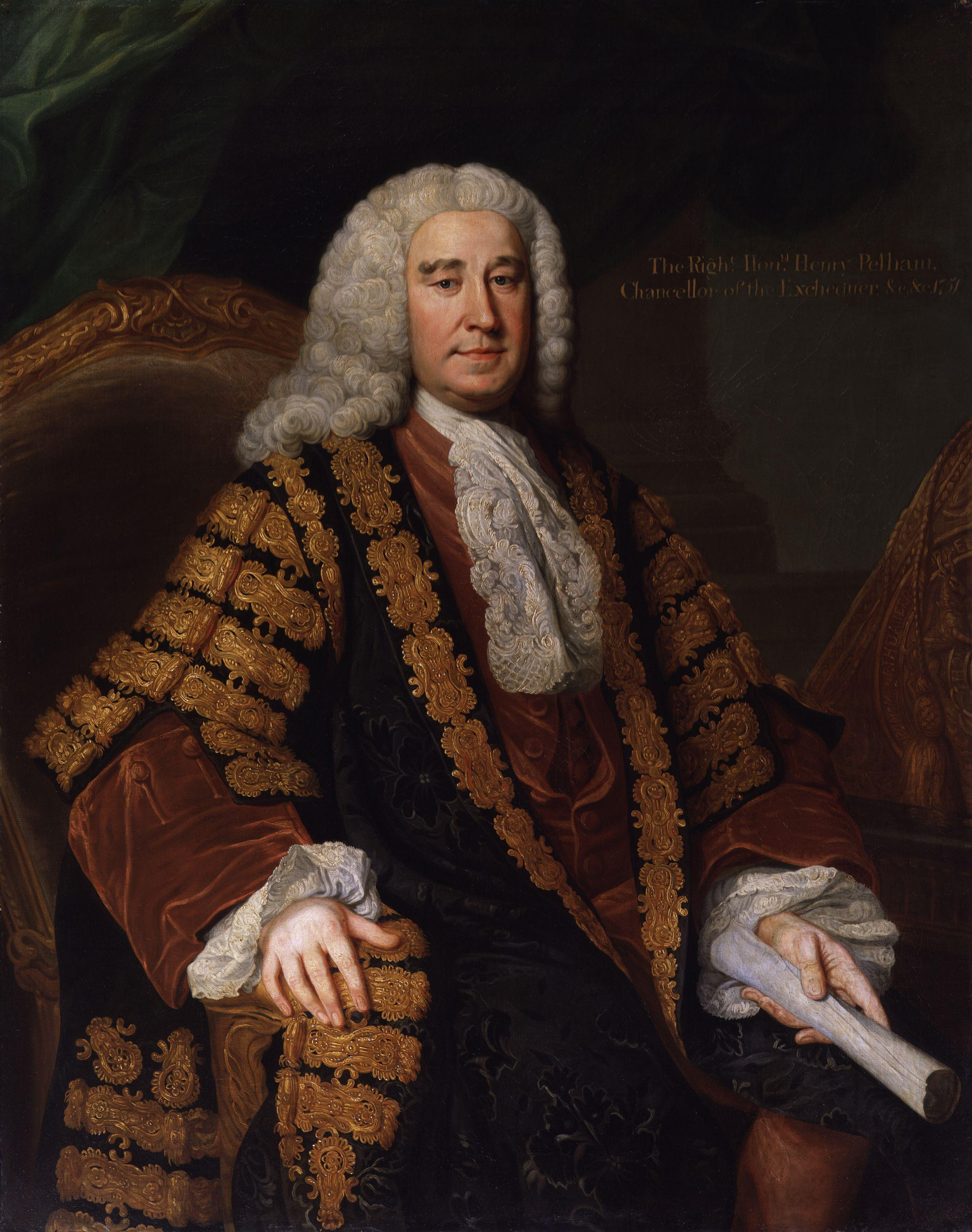
Henry Pelham

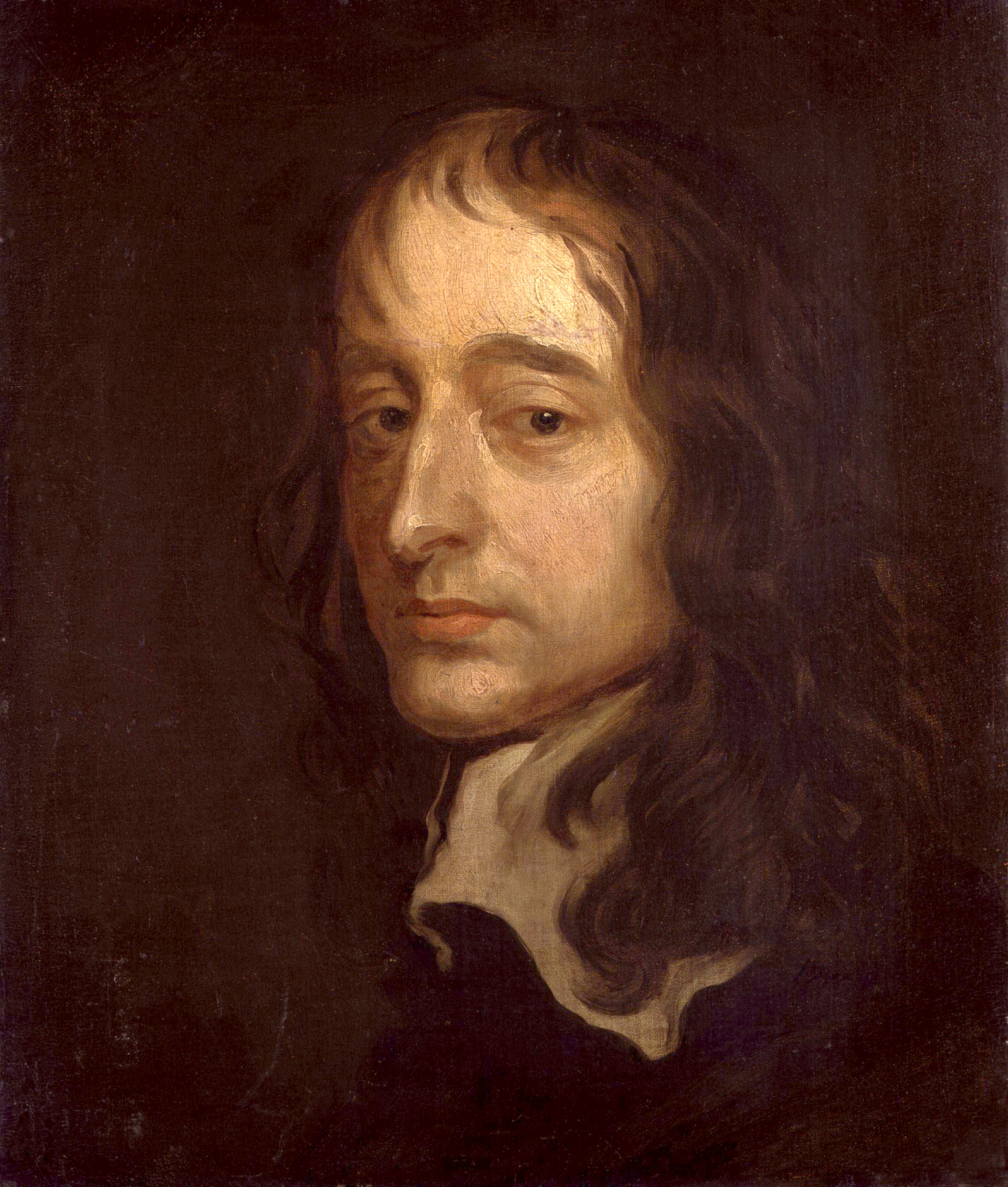
John Selden

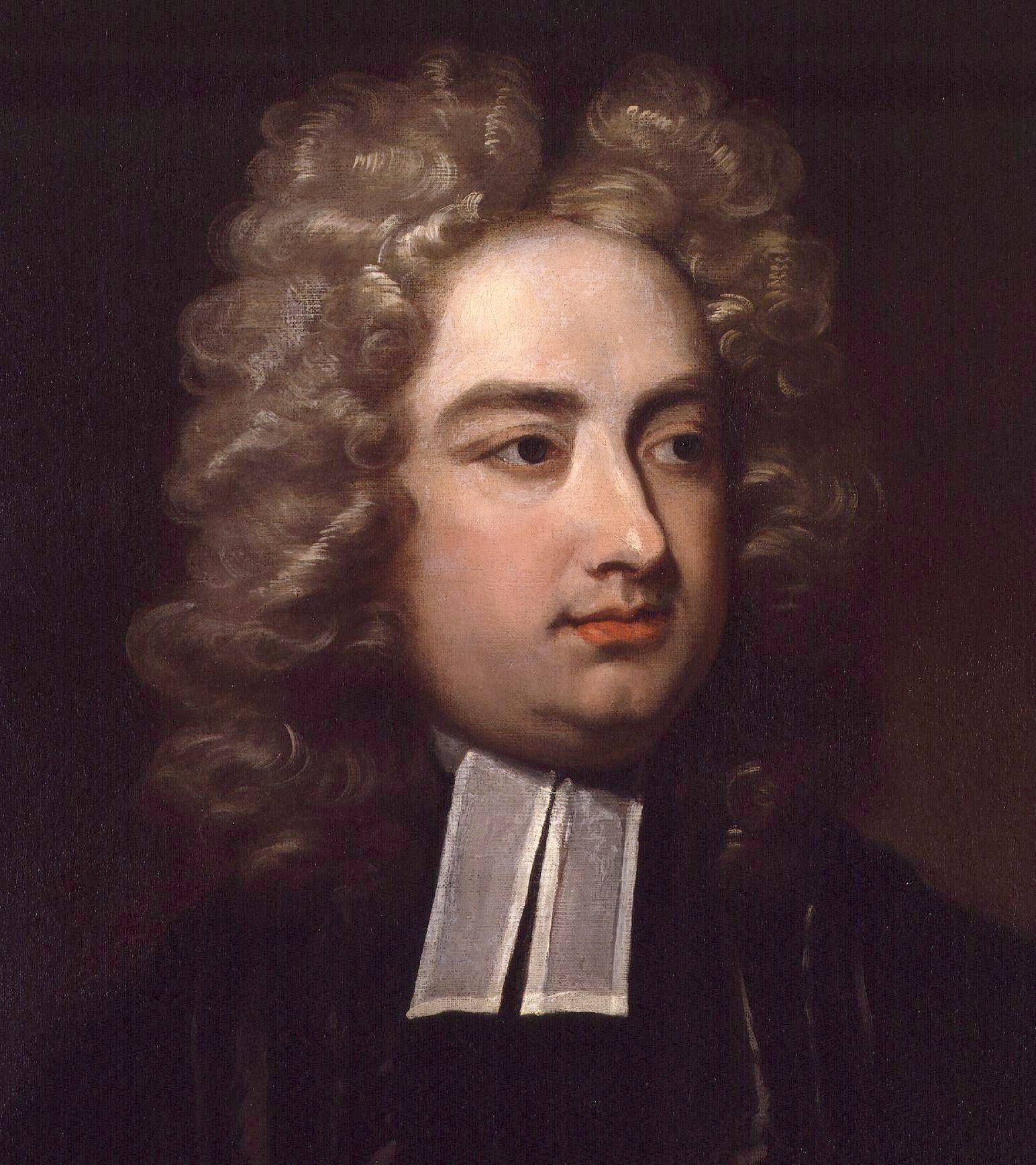
Jonathan Swift

=== Magdalen Hall (1480–1874) ===
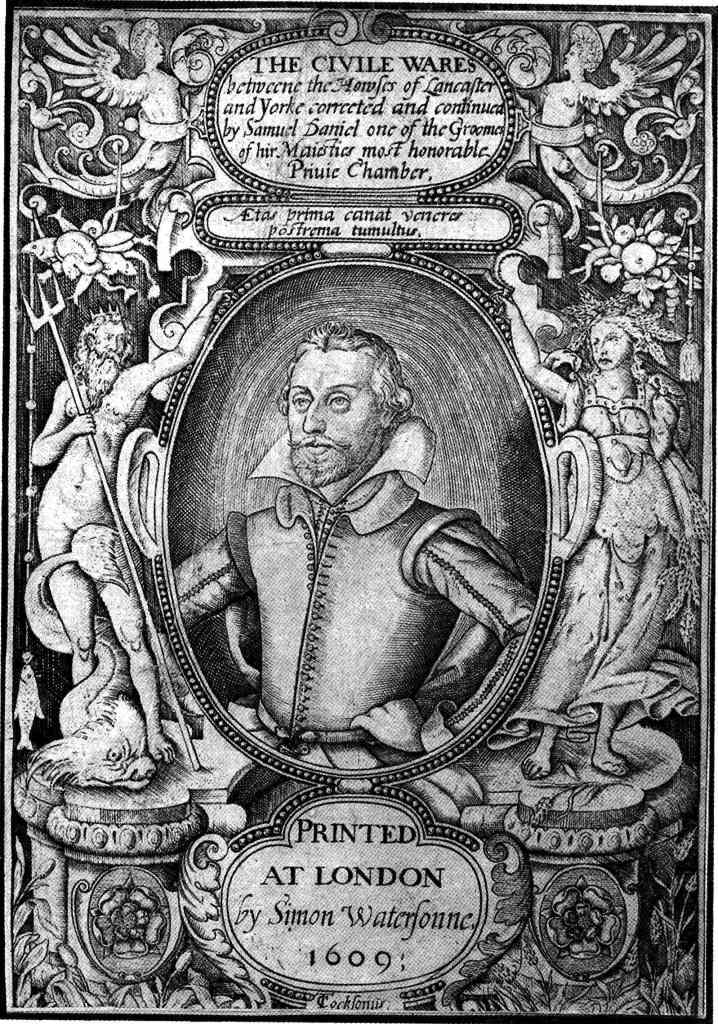
Samuel Daniel

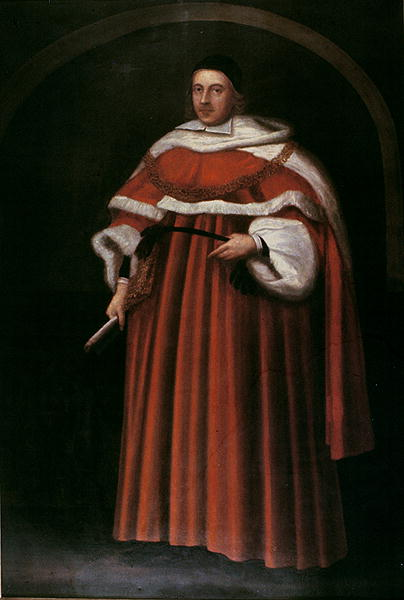
Matthew Hale

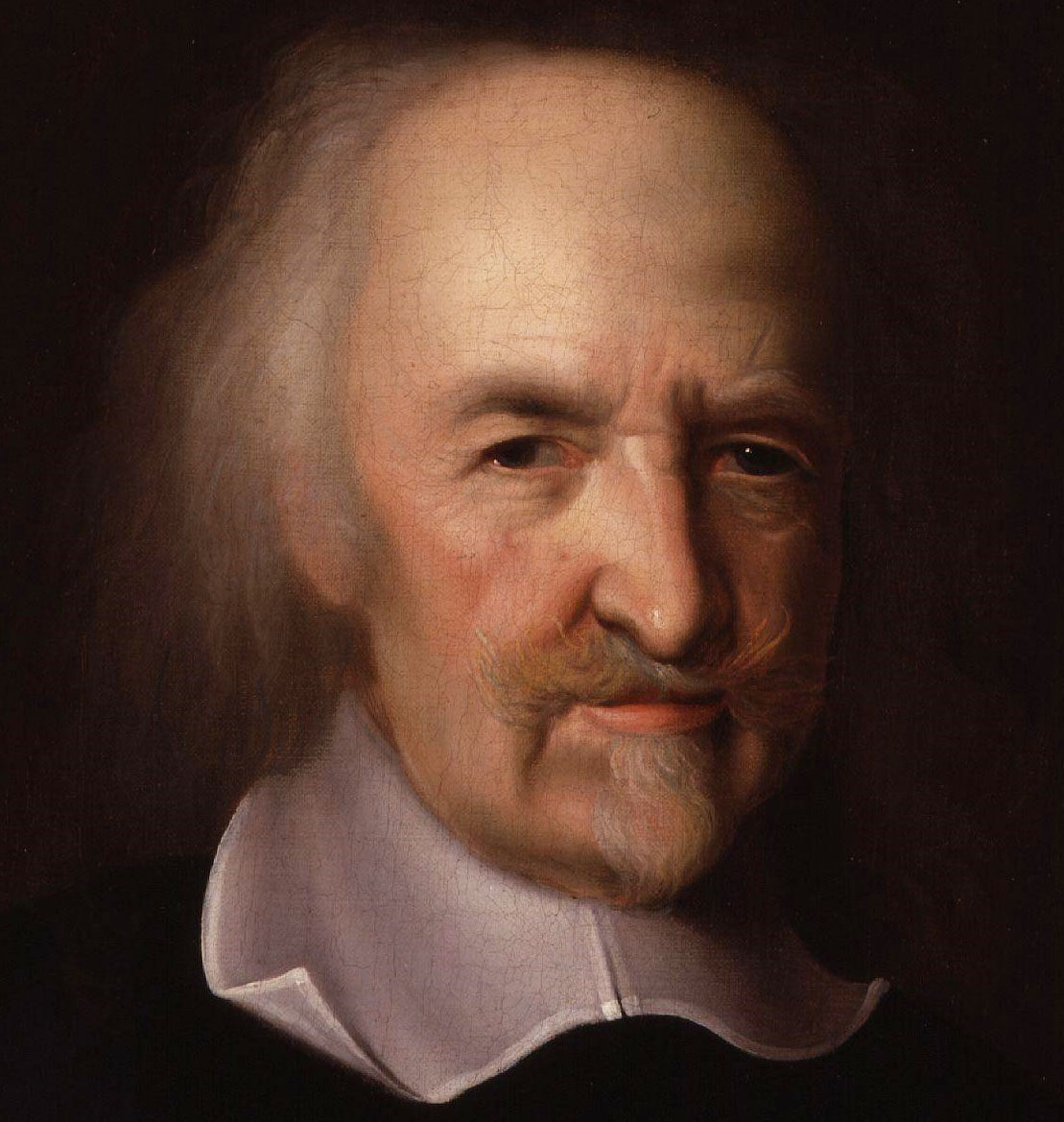
Thomas Hobbes

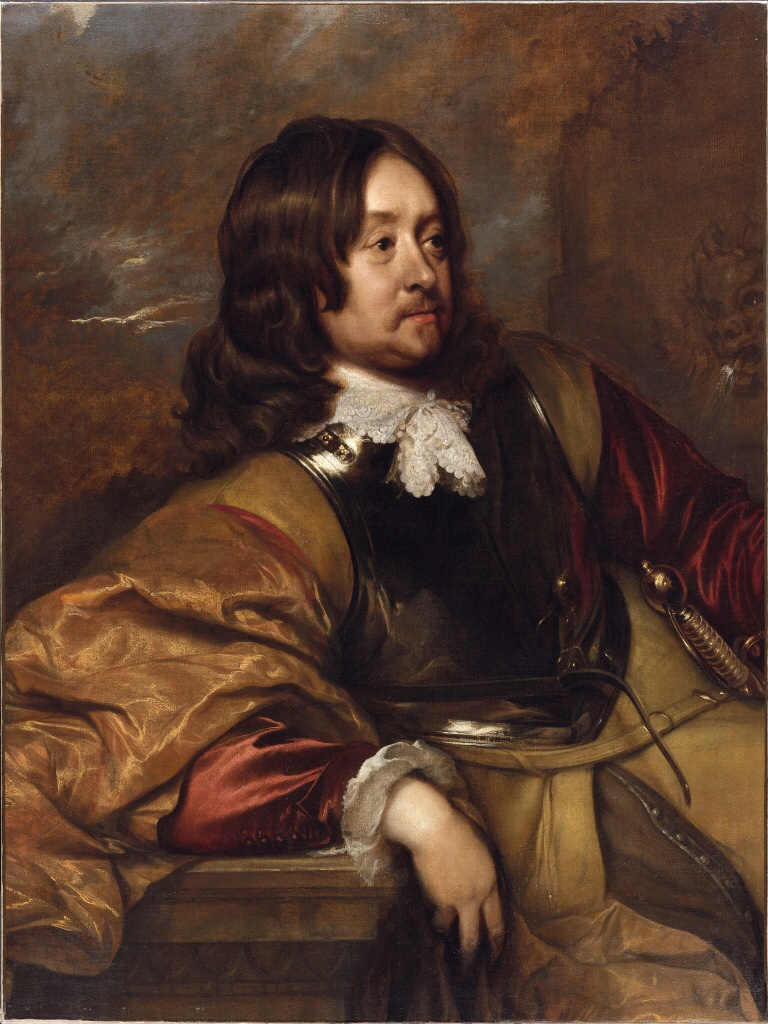
Edward Hyde, 1st Earl of Clarendon

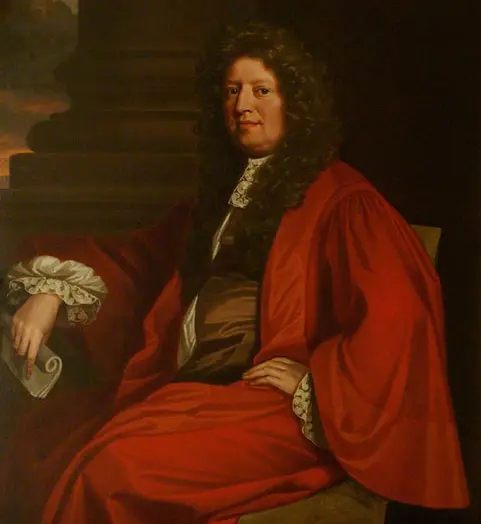
Robert Plot

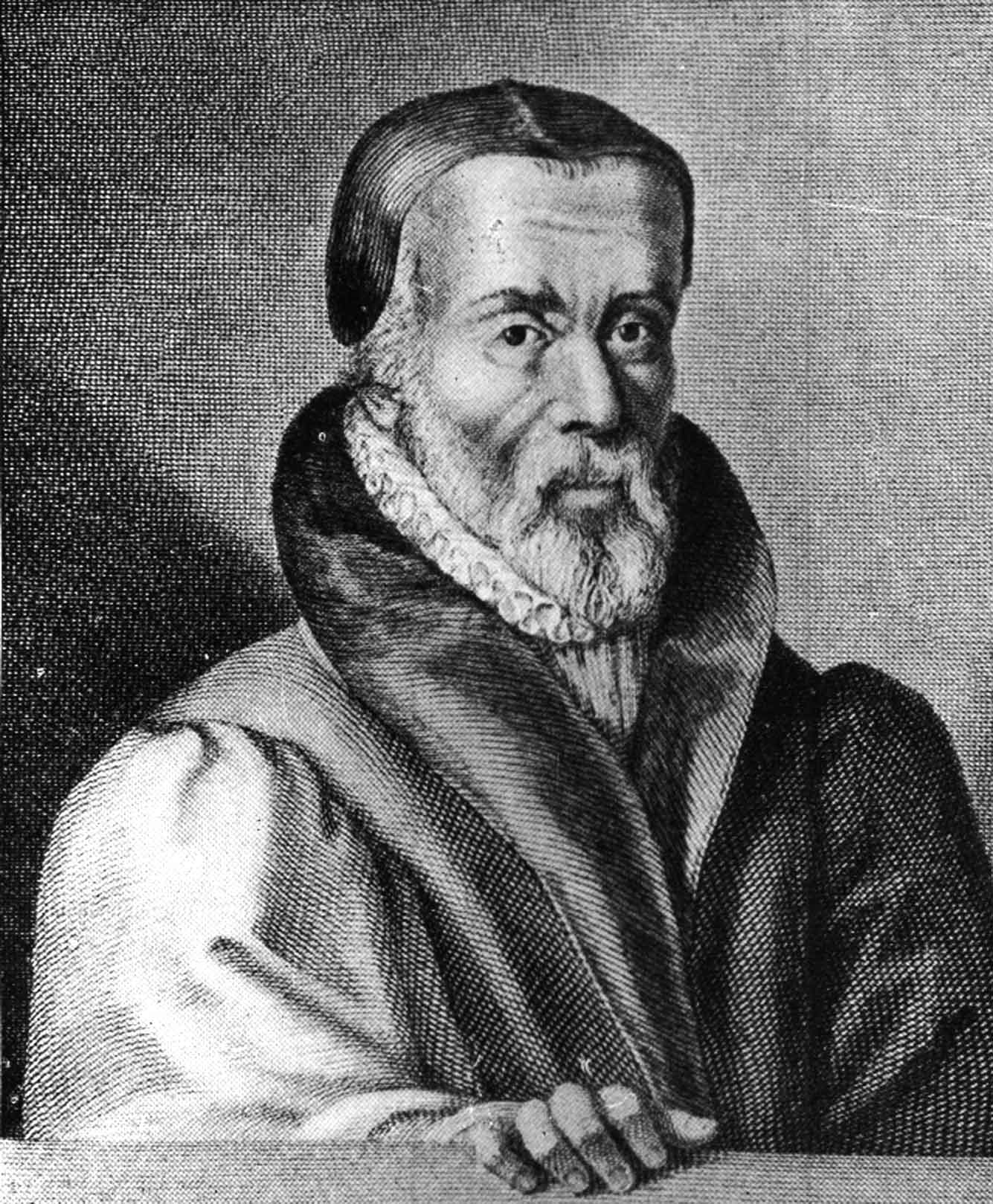
William Tyndale

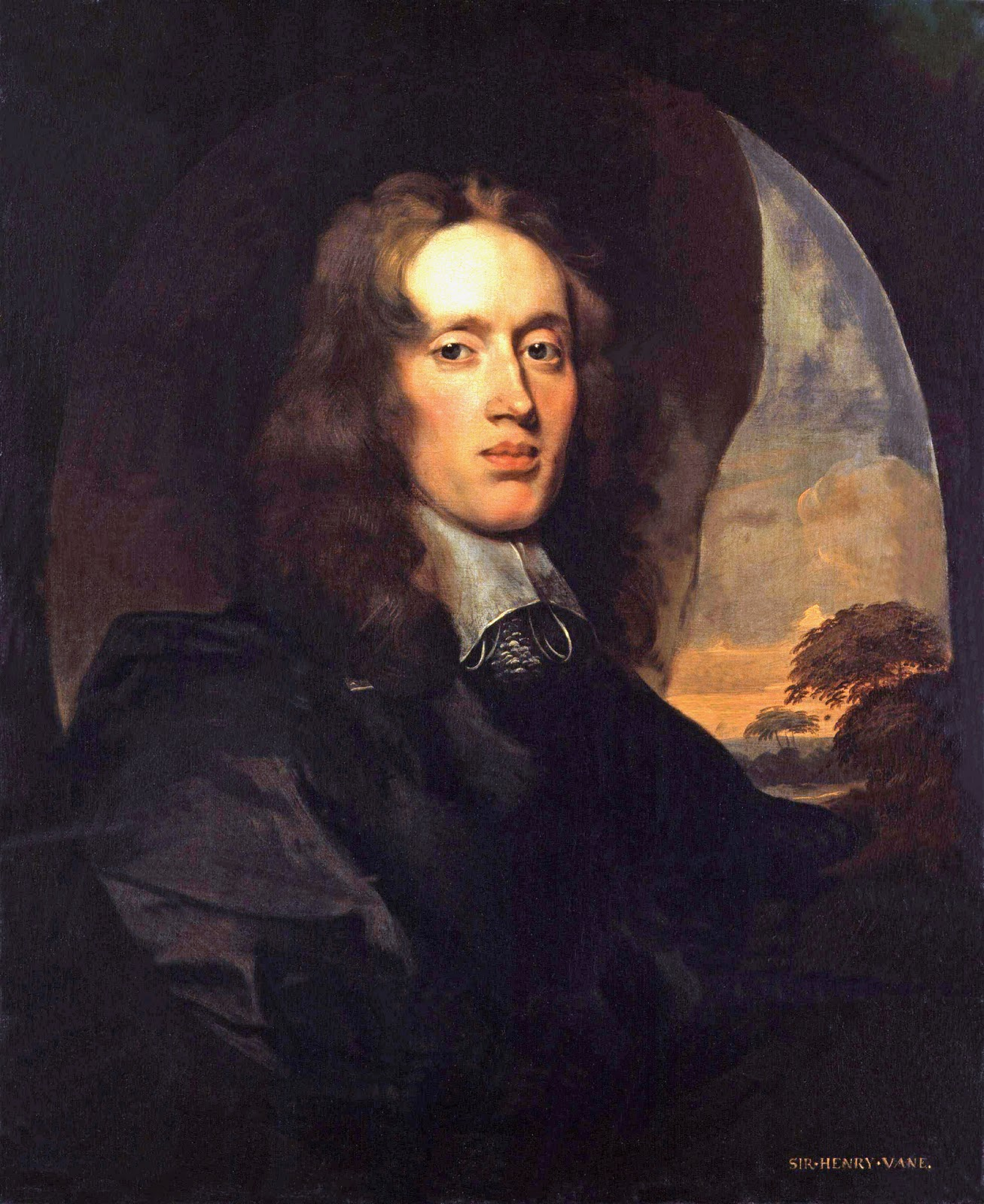
Henry Vane the Younger

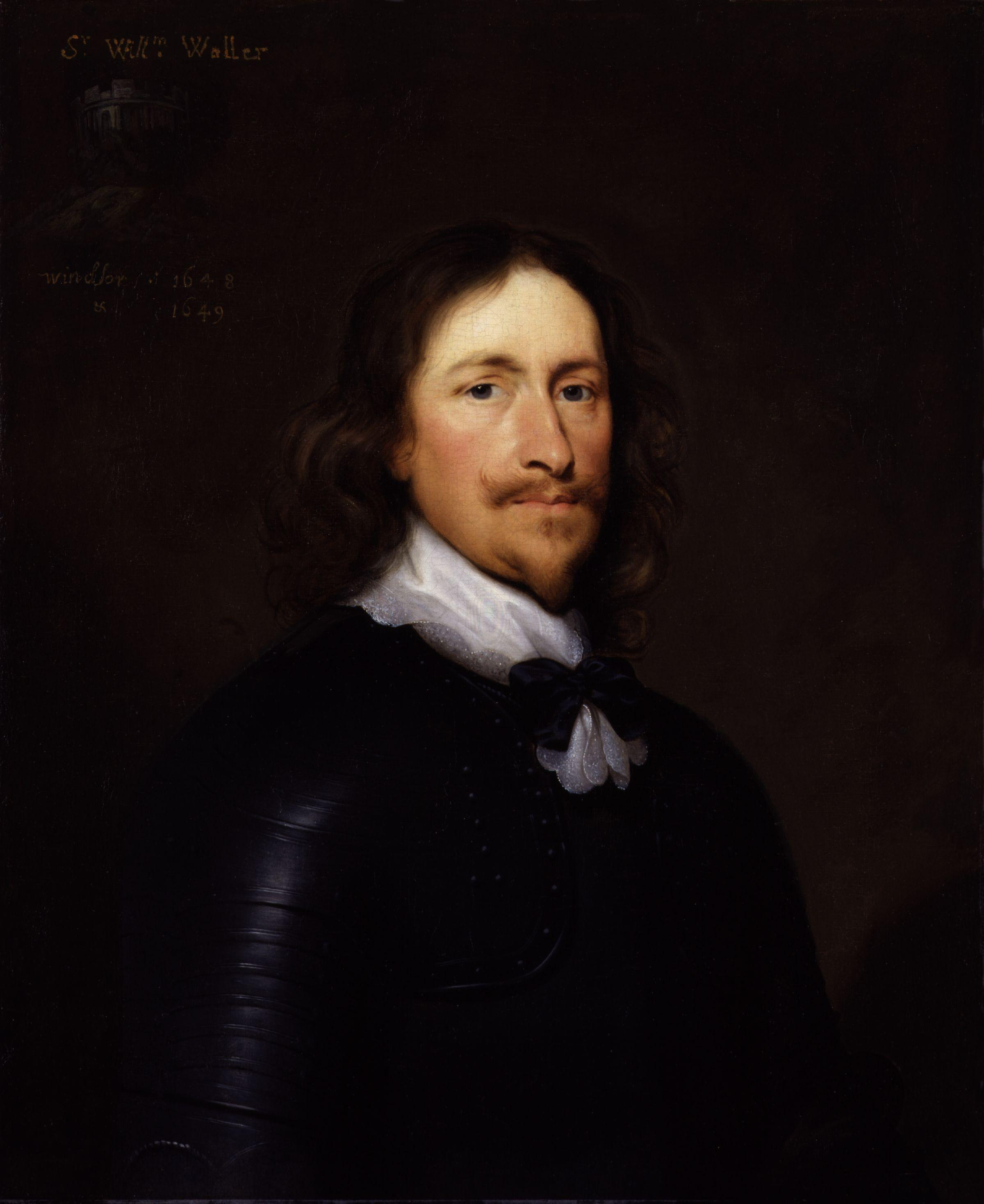
William Waller

=== The second Hertford College (1874–present) ===
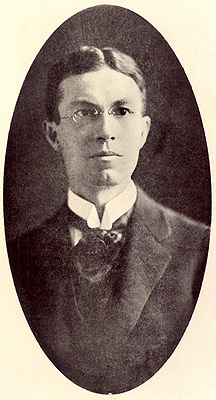
John Behan

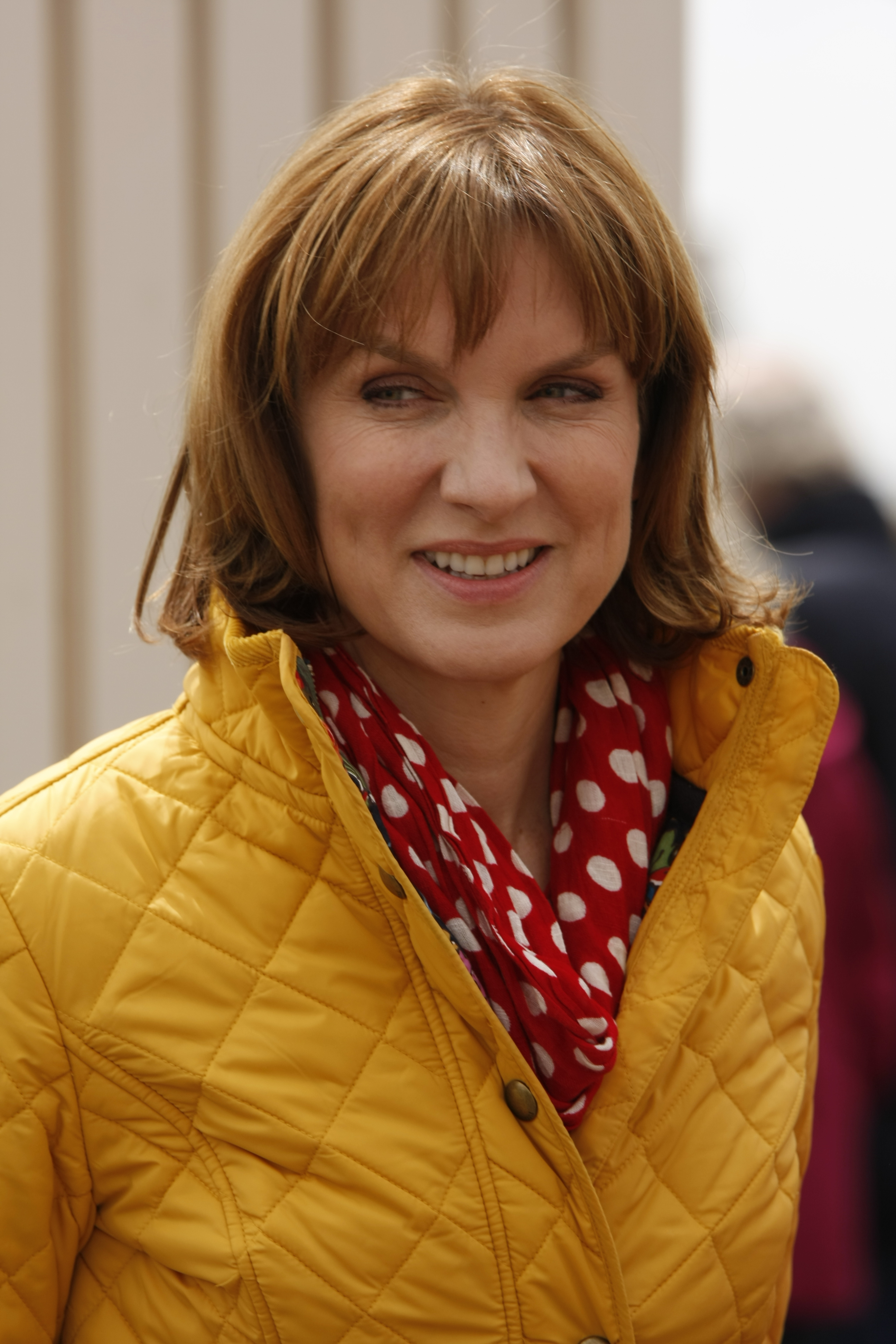
Fiona Bruce

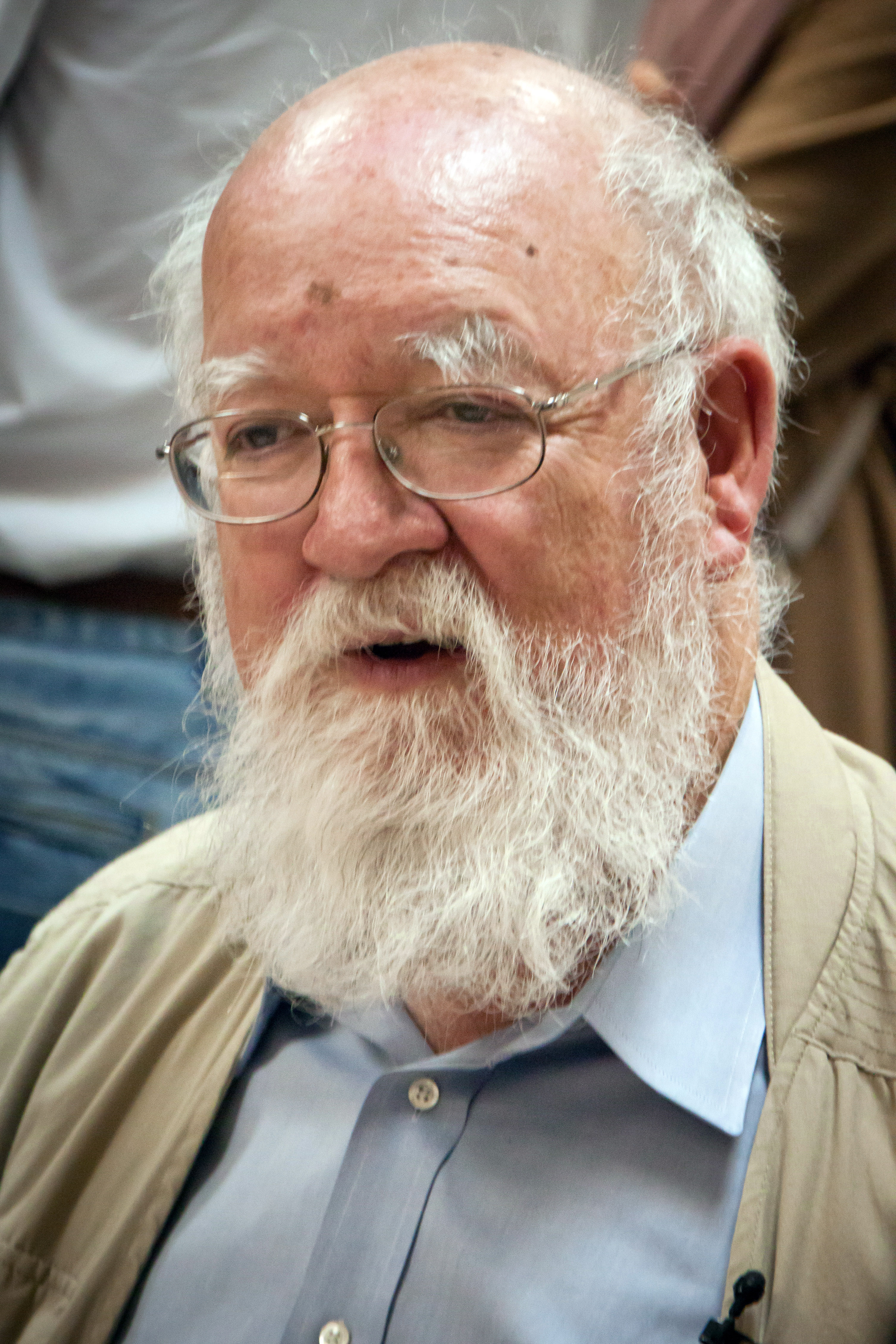
Daniel Dennett

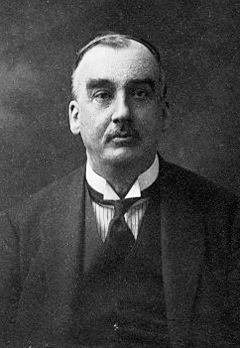
J. Meade Falkner

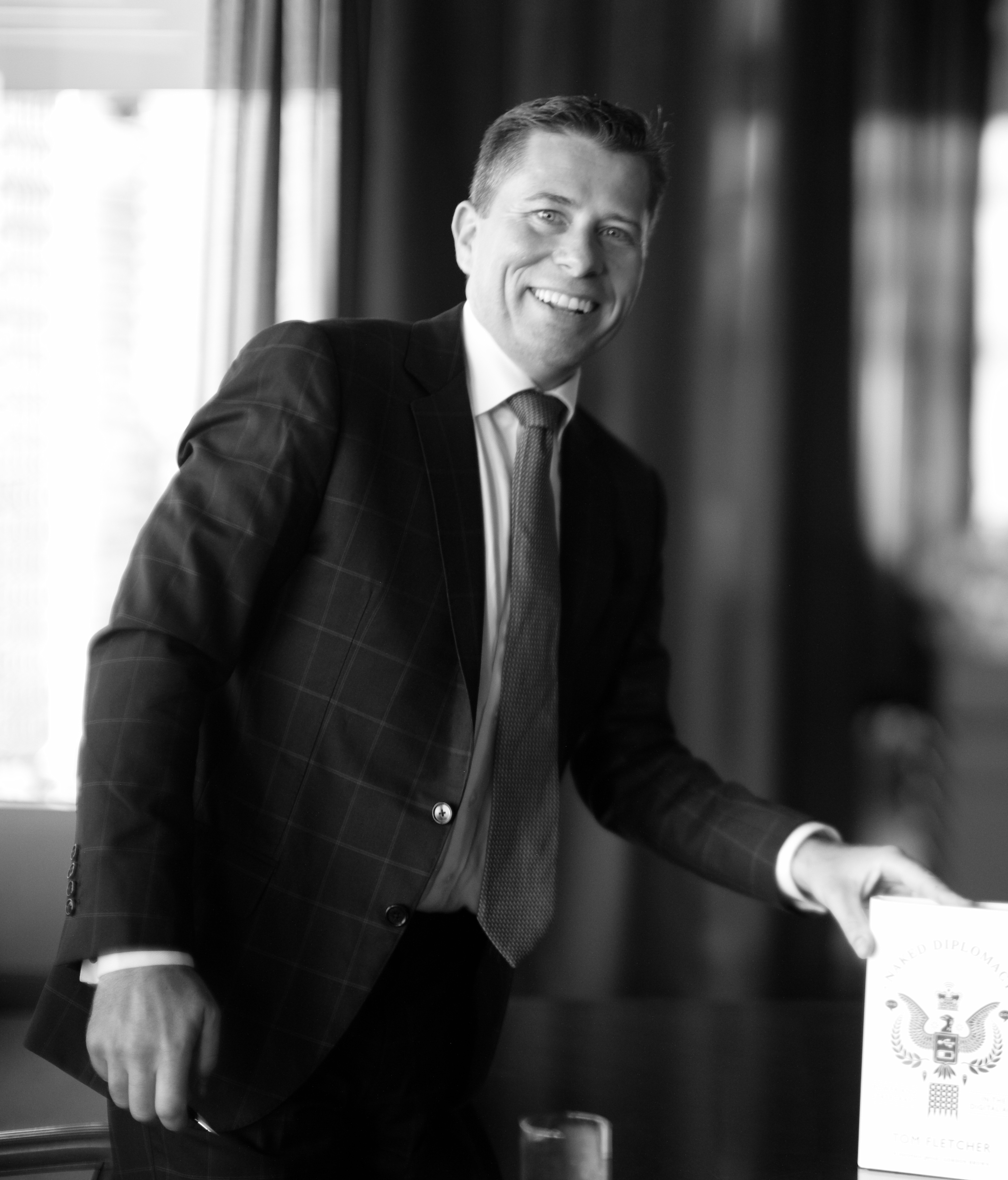
Tom Fletcher

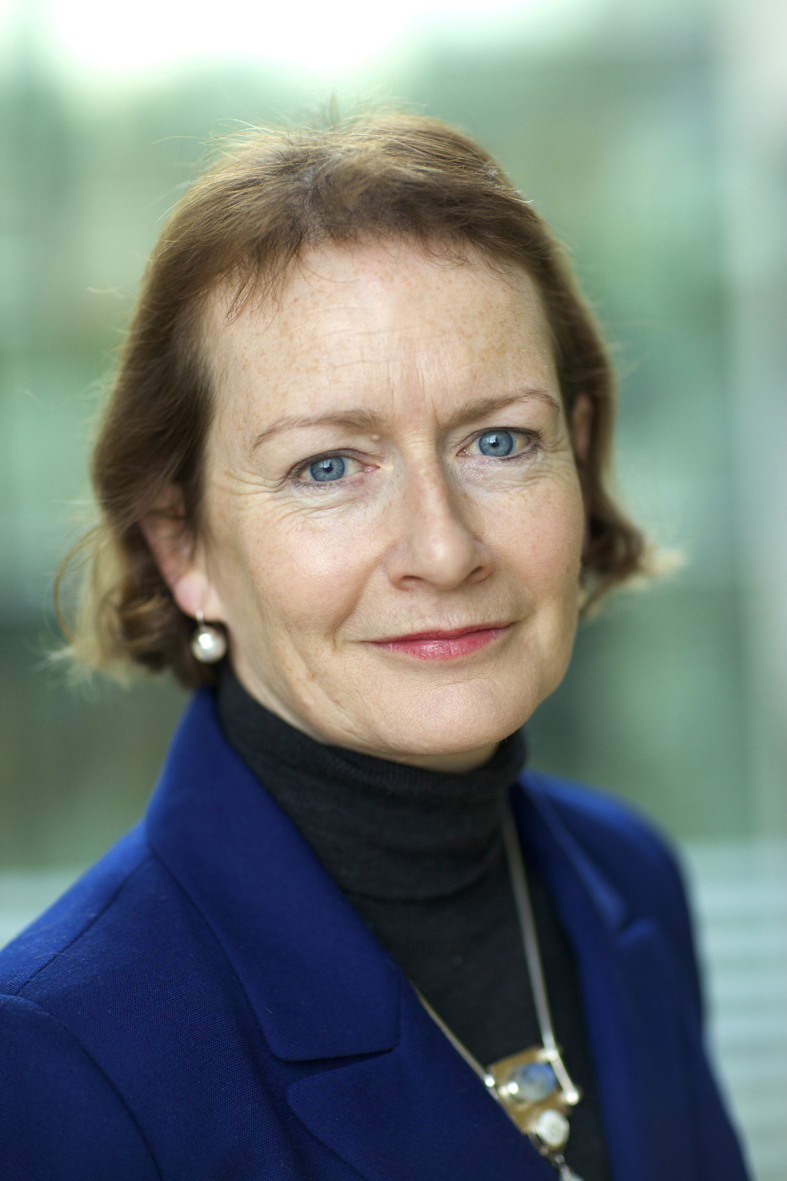
Helen Ghosh

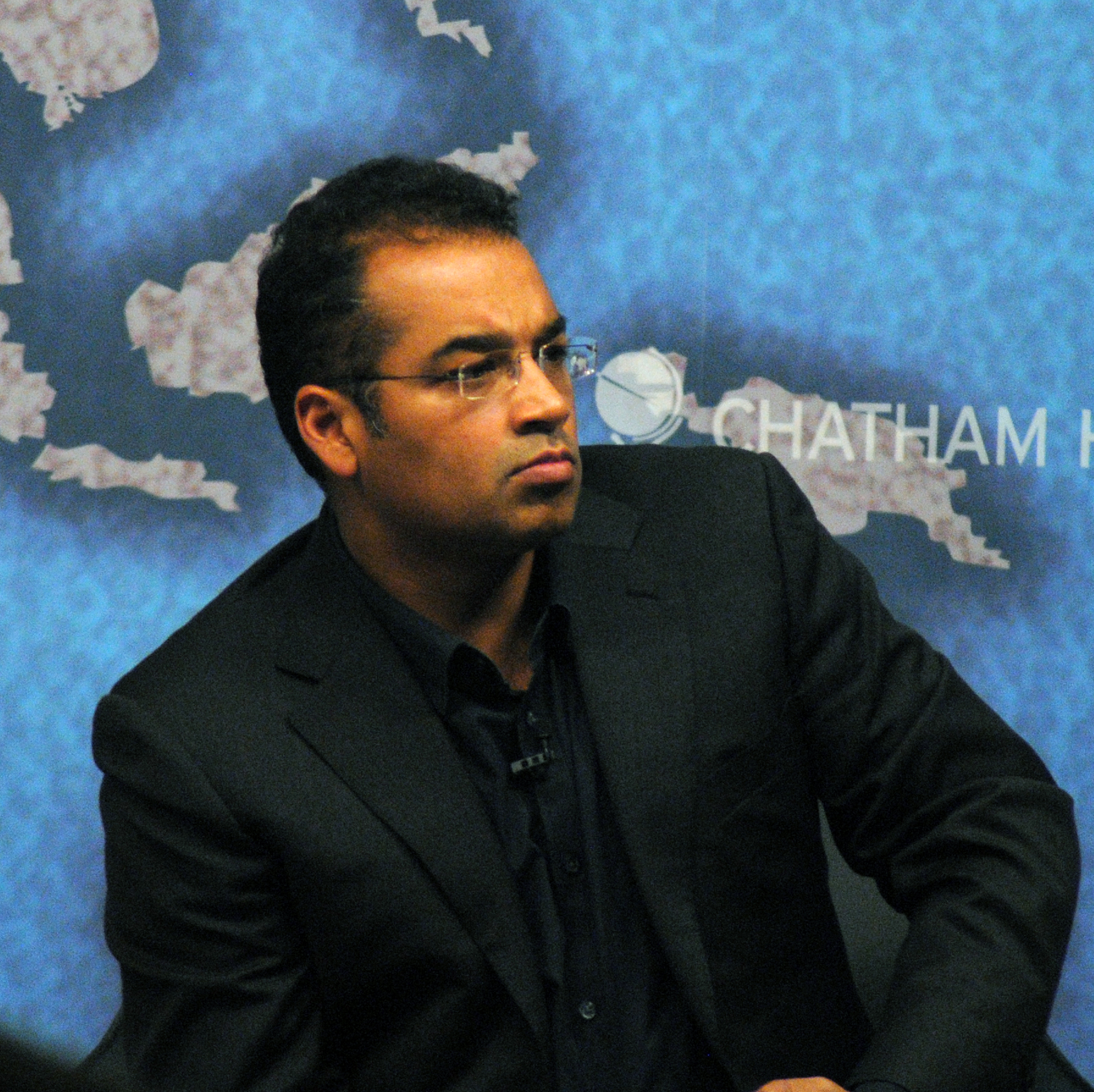
Krishnan Guru-Murthy

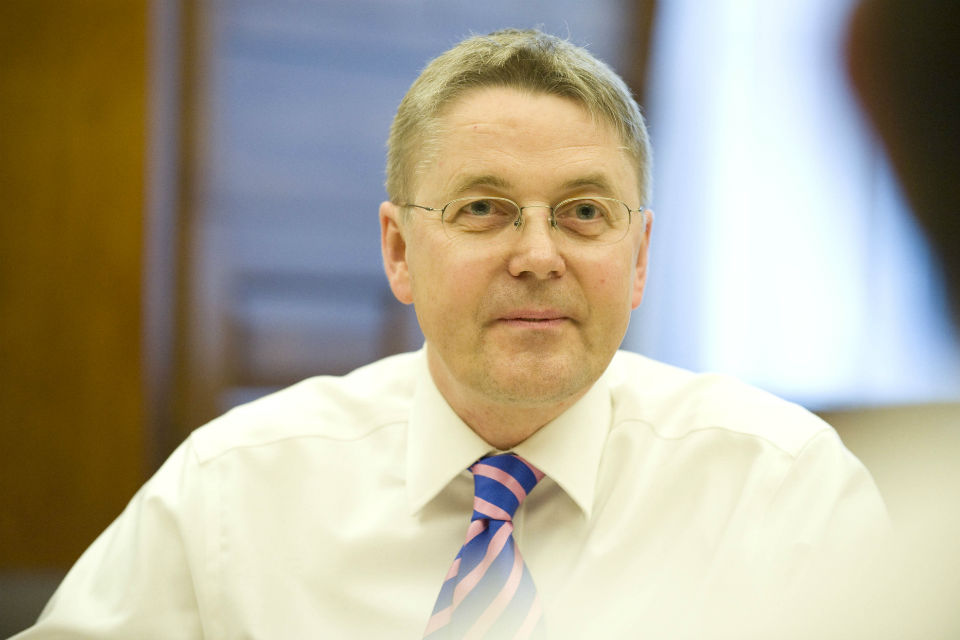
Jeremy Heywood

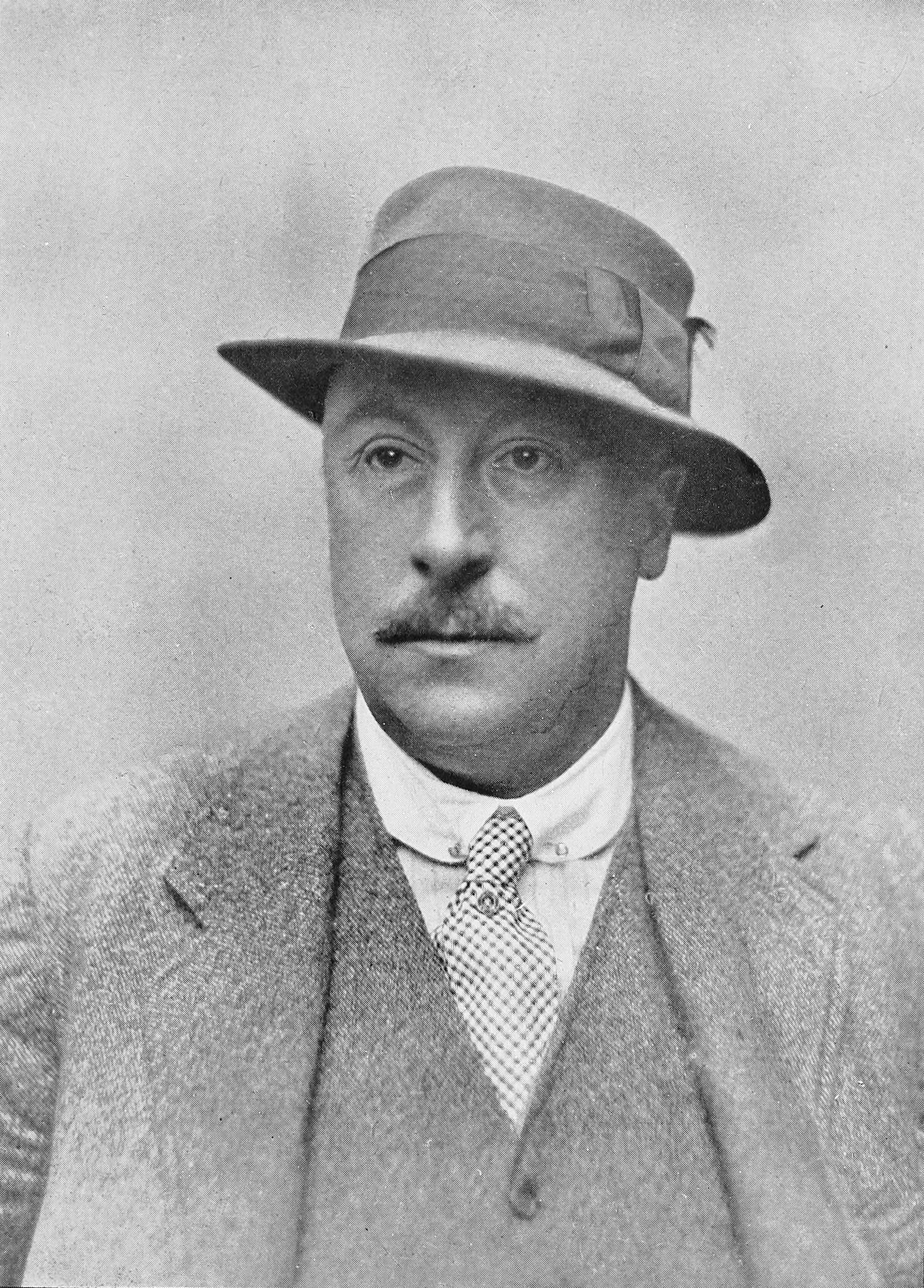
James John Joicey

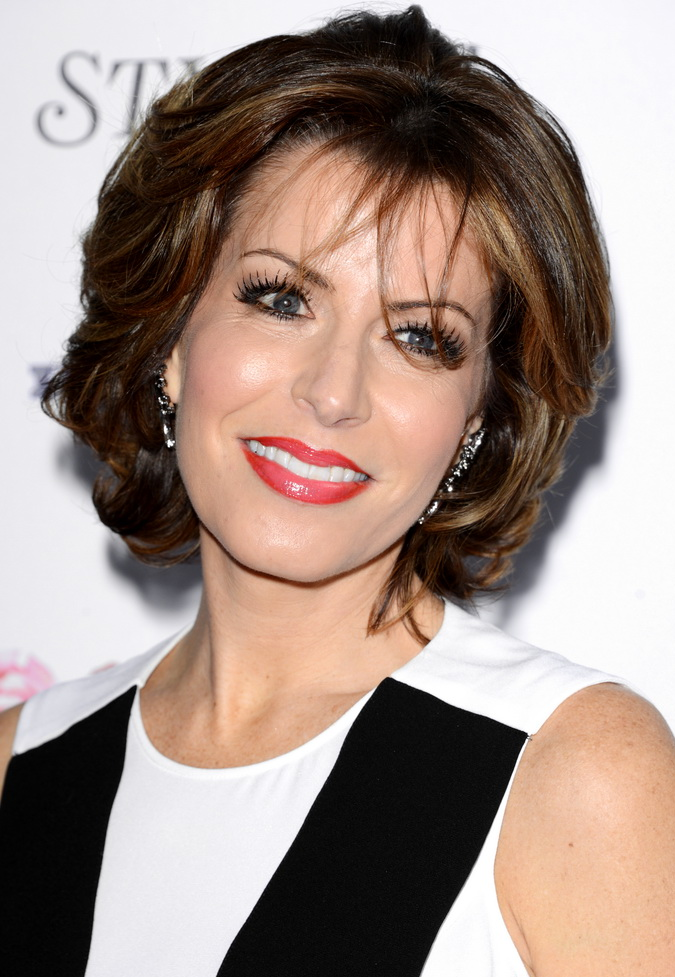
Natasha Kaplinsky

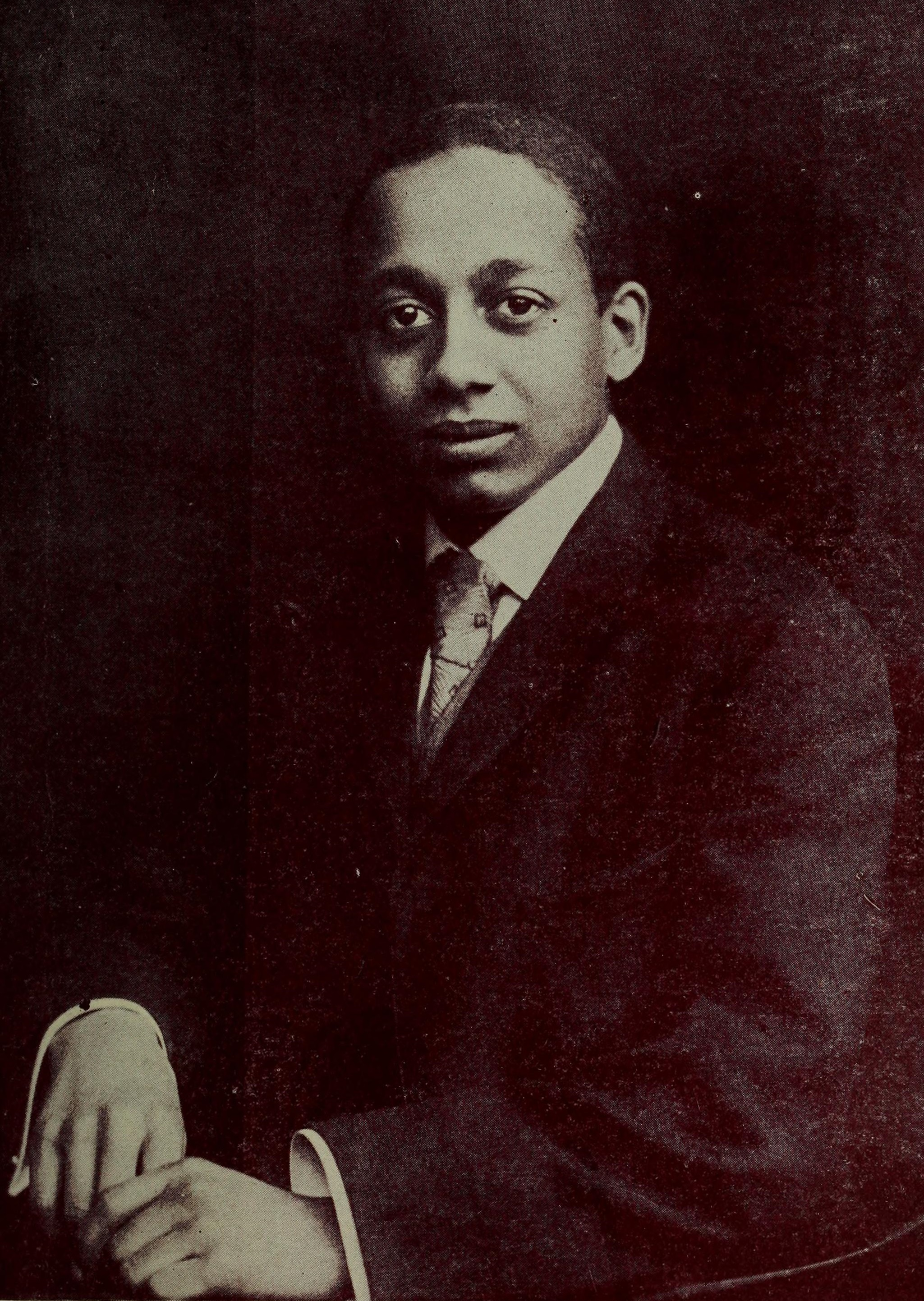
Alain LeRoy Locke

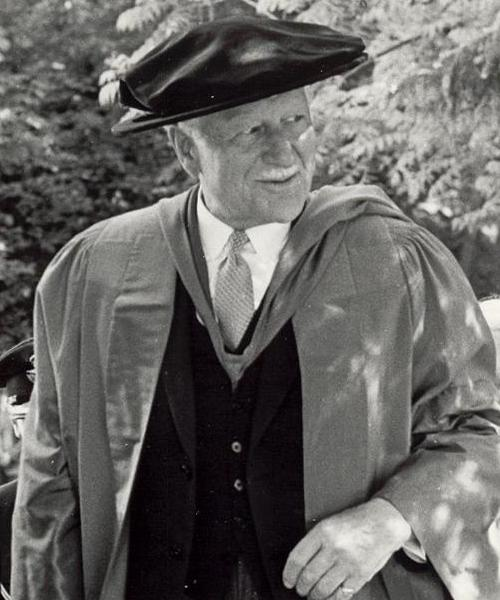
Roland Michener

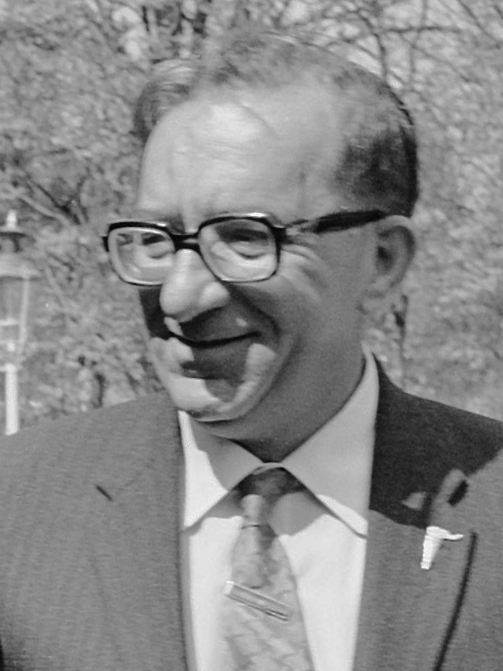
Dom Mintoff

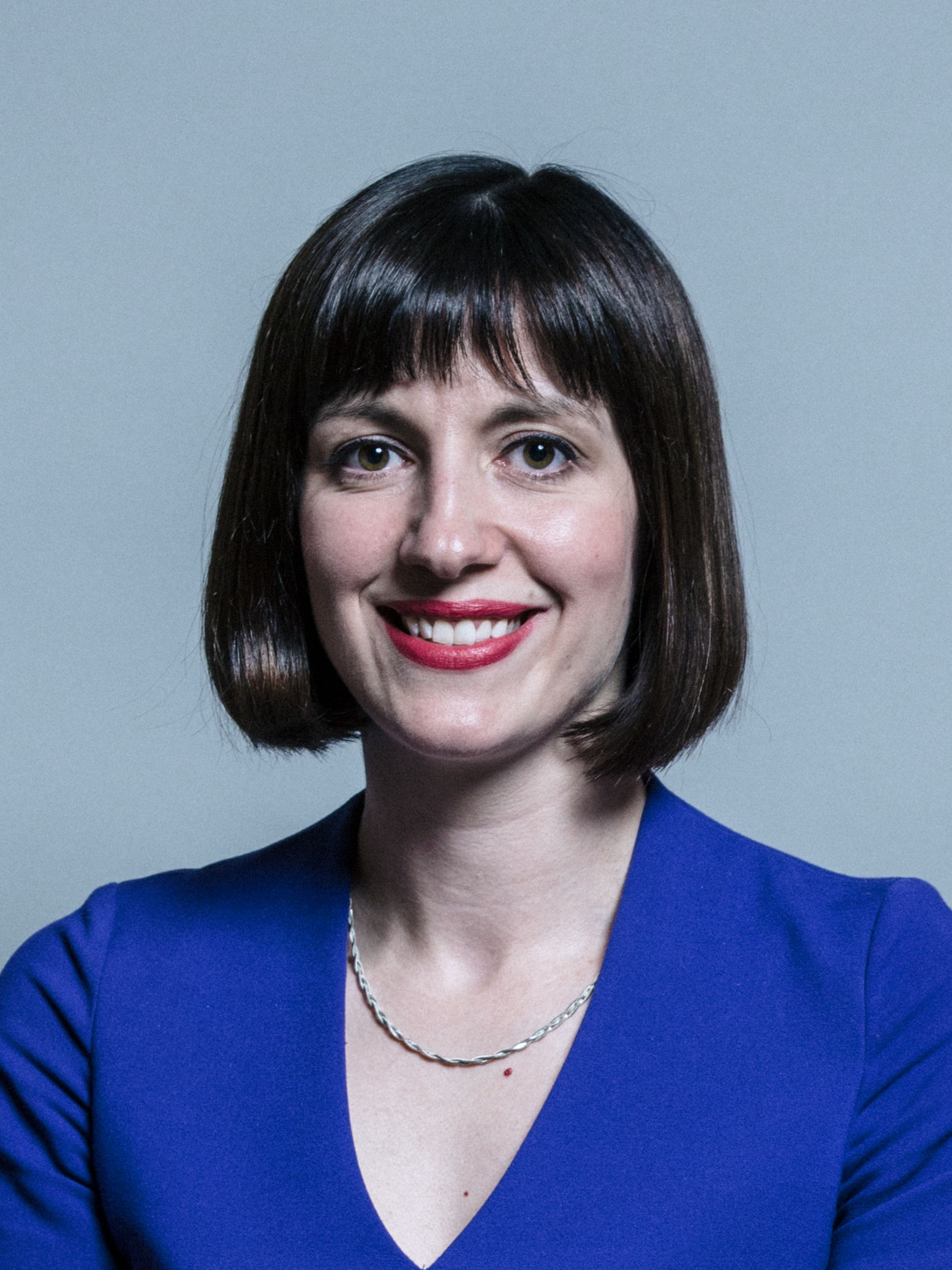
Bridget Phillipson

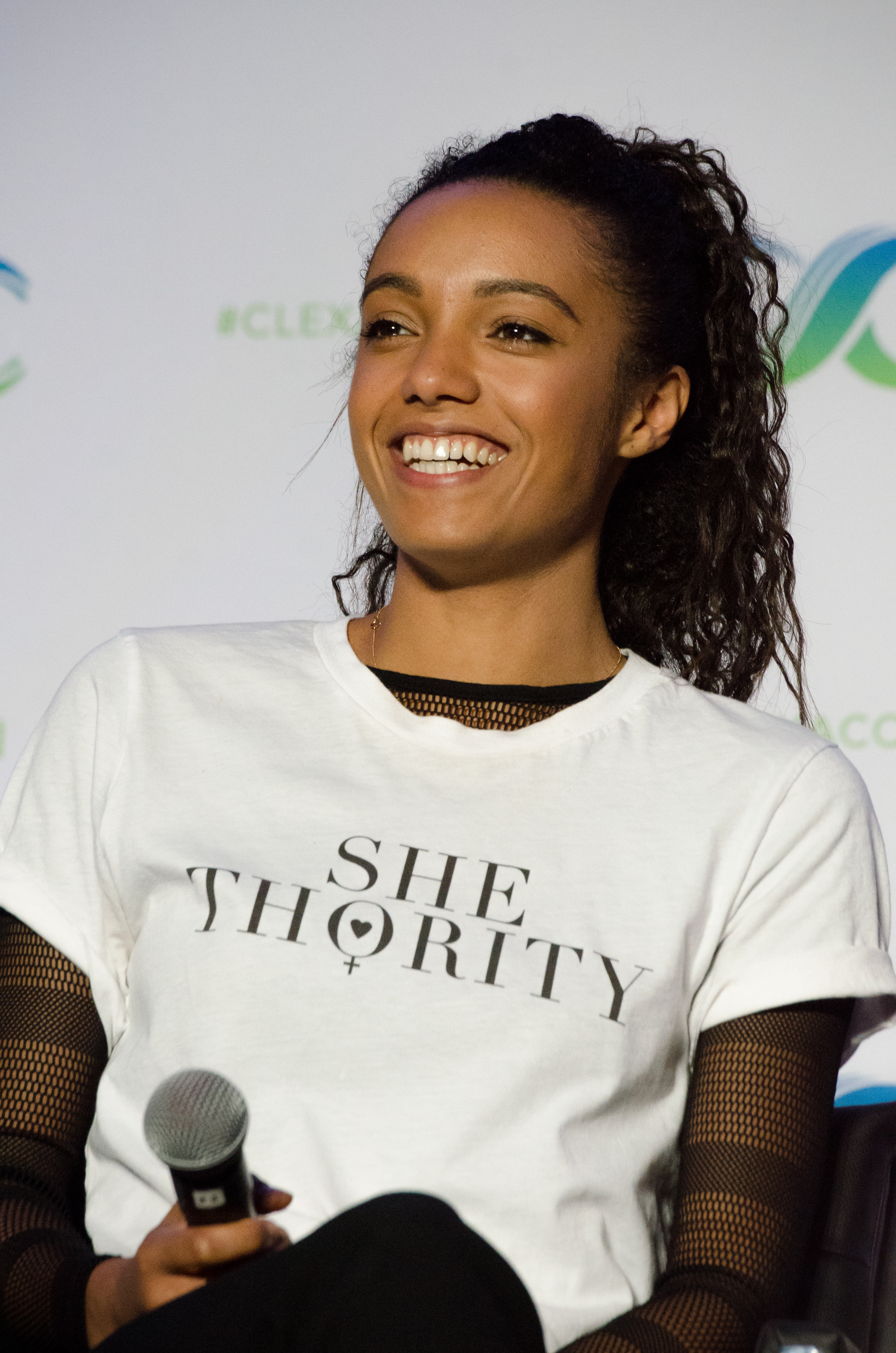
Maisie Richardson-Sellers

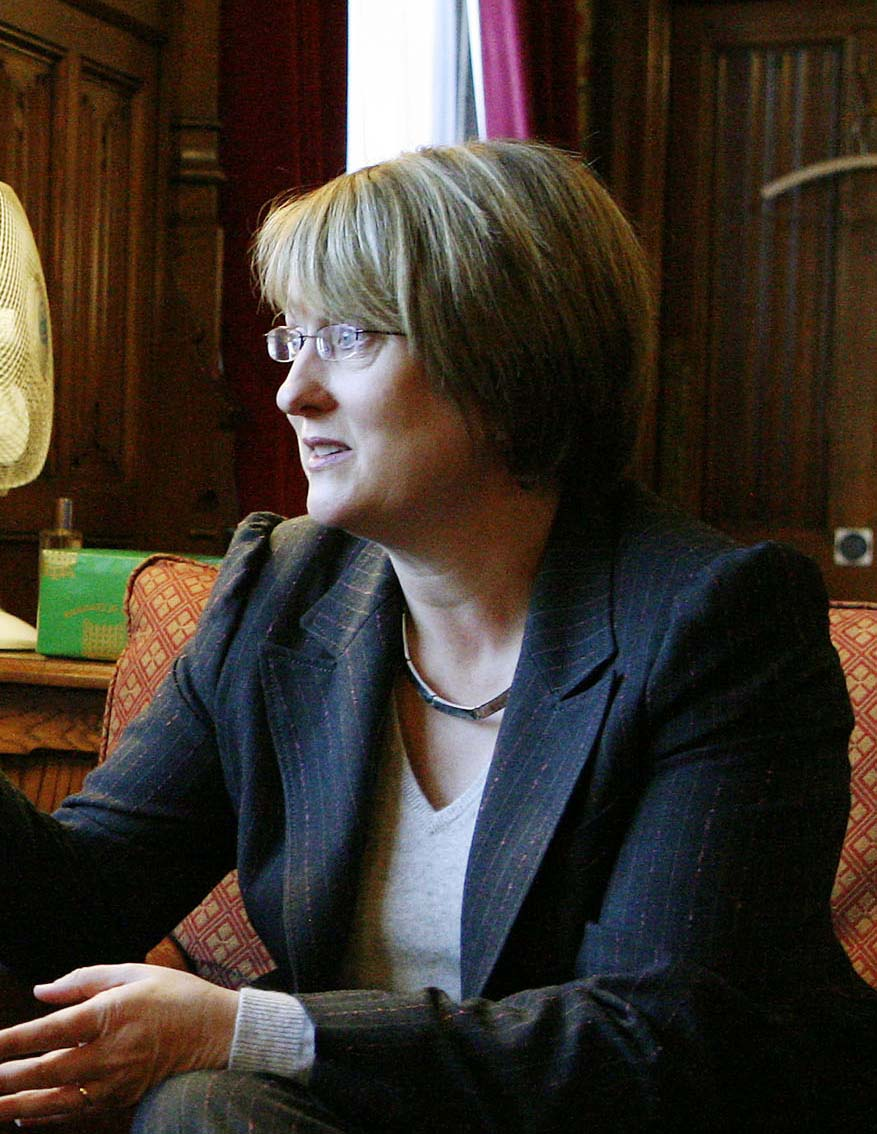
Jacqui Smith

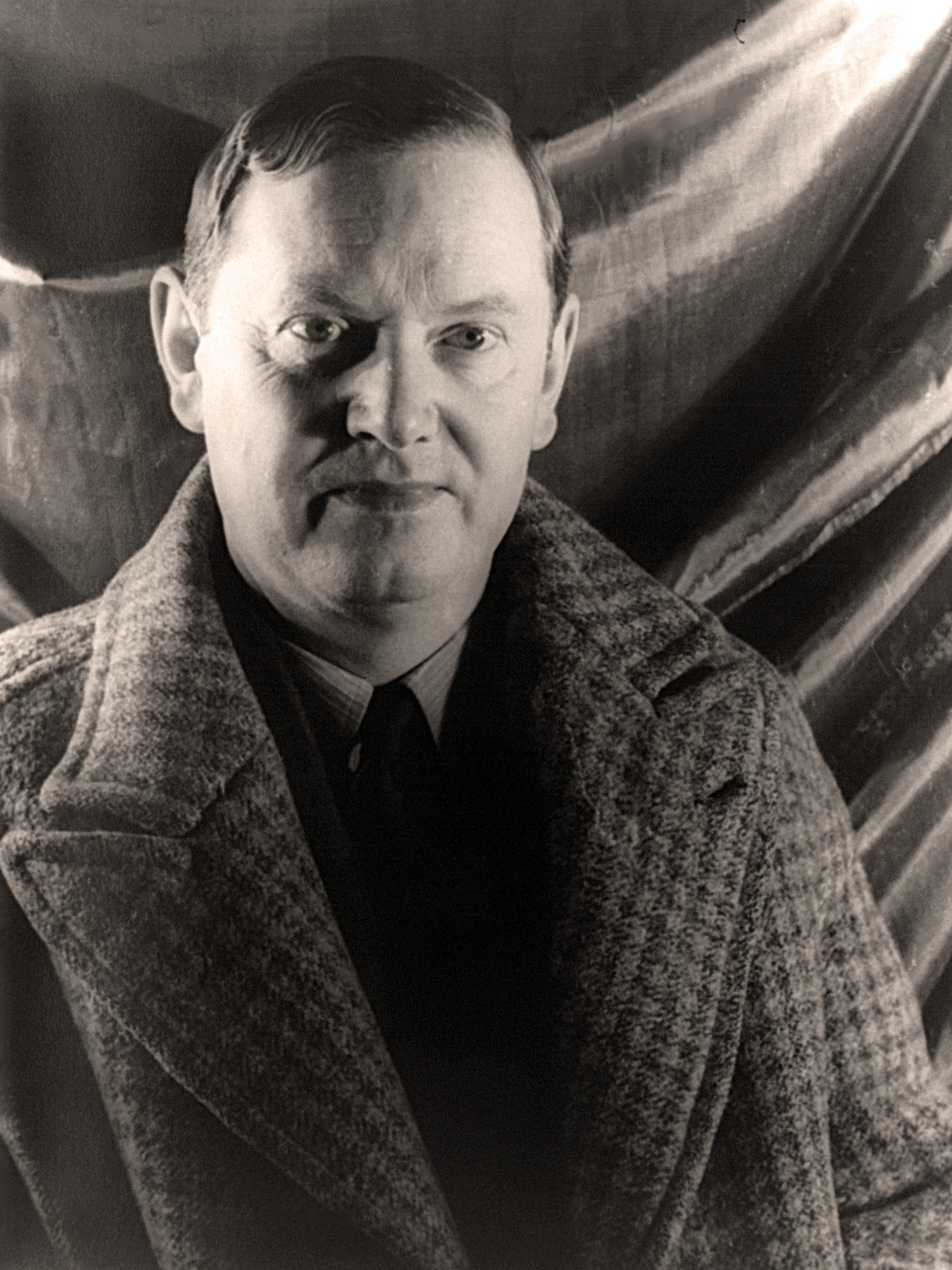
Evelyn Waugh

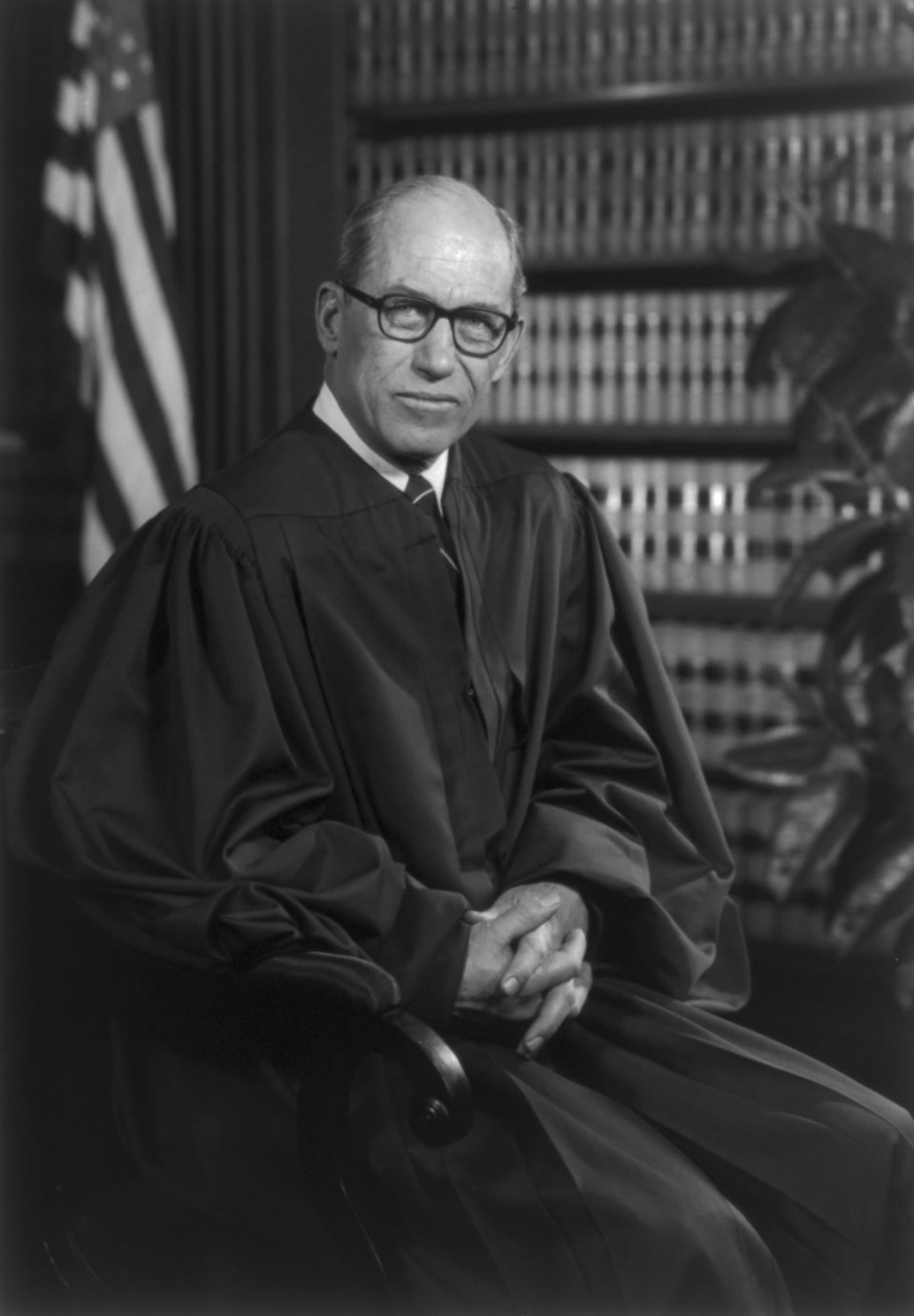
Byron White

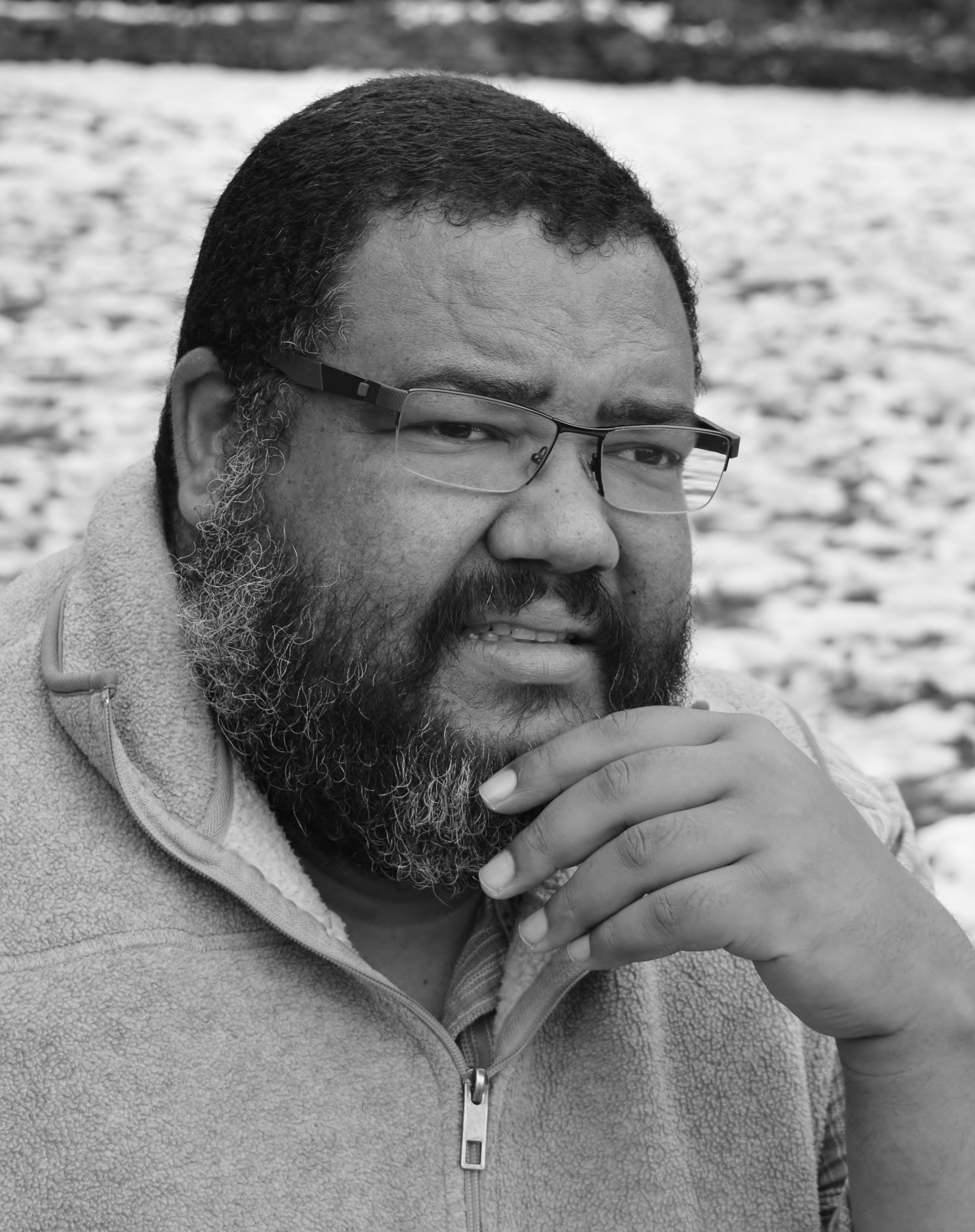
Athol Williams

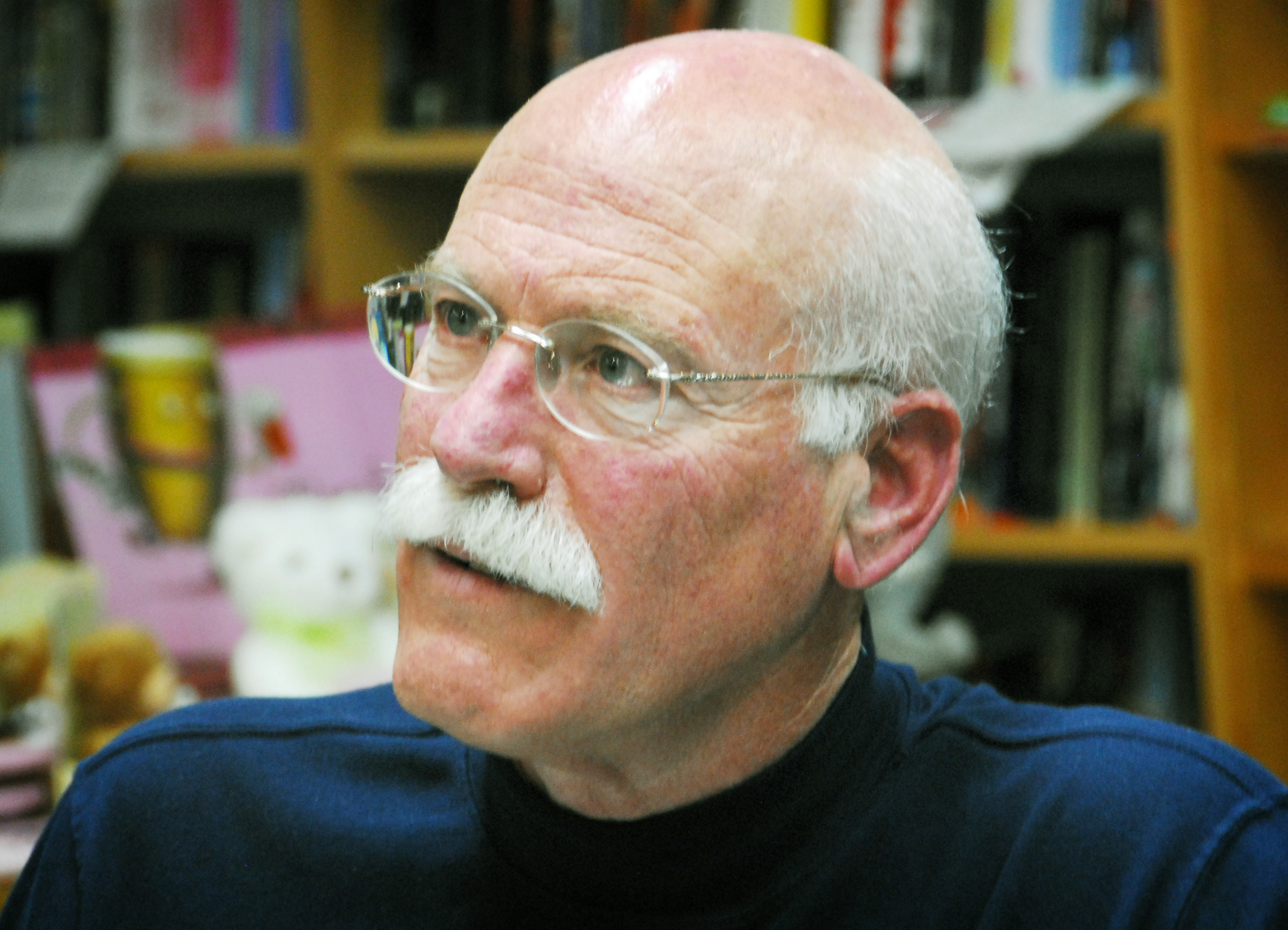
Tobias Wolff

== Bibliography ==
- Goudie, Andrew, ed. (1999) [1984]. Seven Hundred Years of an Oxford College: Hertford College, 1284–1984 (2nd ed.). Hertford College, Oxford.
- Hamilton, Sidney Graves (1903). Hertford College. London: F.E. Robinson. OL 23303320M. also at Internet archive
- "Hertford College". A History of the County of Oxford. Vol. 3. The University of Oxford. 1954. pp. 309–319.
- Newton, R. (1747). Barnard, Toby (ed.). Rules and Statutes for the Government of Hertford College, in the University of Oxford. Paternoster Row, London: John Osborn.
- 'Hertford history'. Hertford history
