= List of Old Shirburnians =

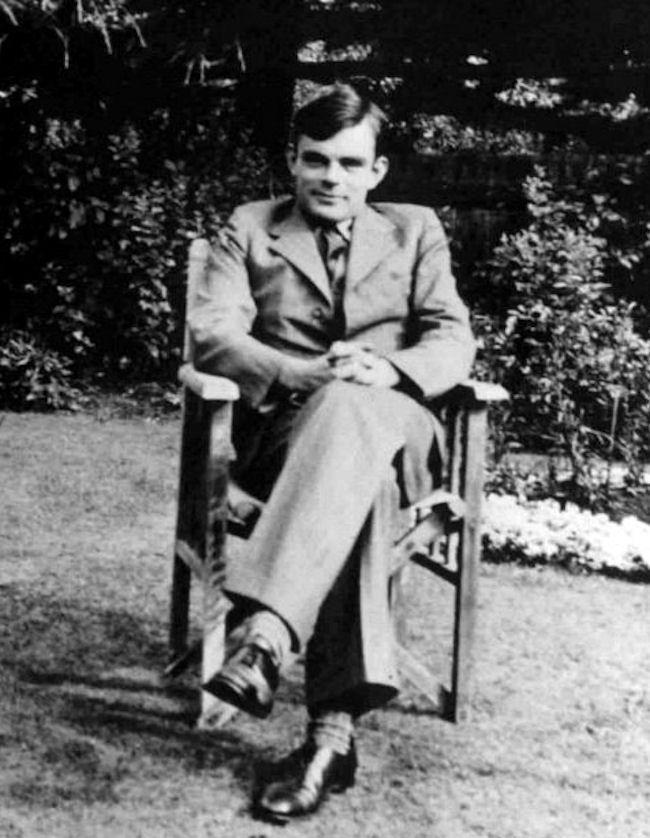
Mathematician, computer scientist, logician, cryptanalyst, philosopher and theoretical biologist Alan Turing

Sherborne is a British full boarding public school located in the town of Sherborne in north-west Dorset.

This list comprises predominantly 20th-century notable Old Shirburnians organised by profession.

== Academia ==
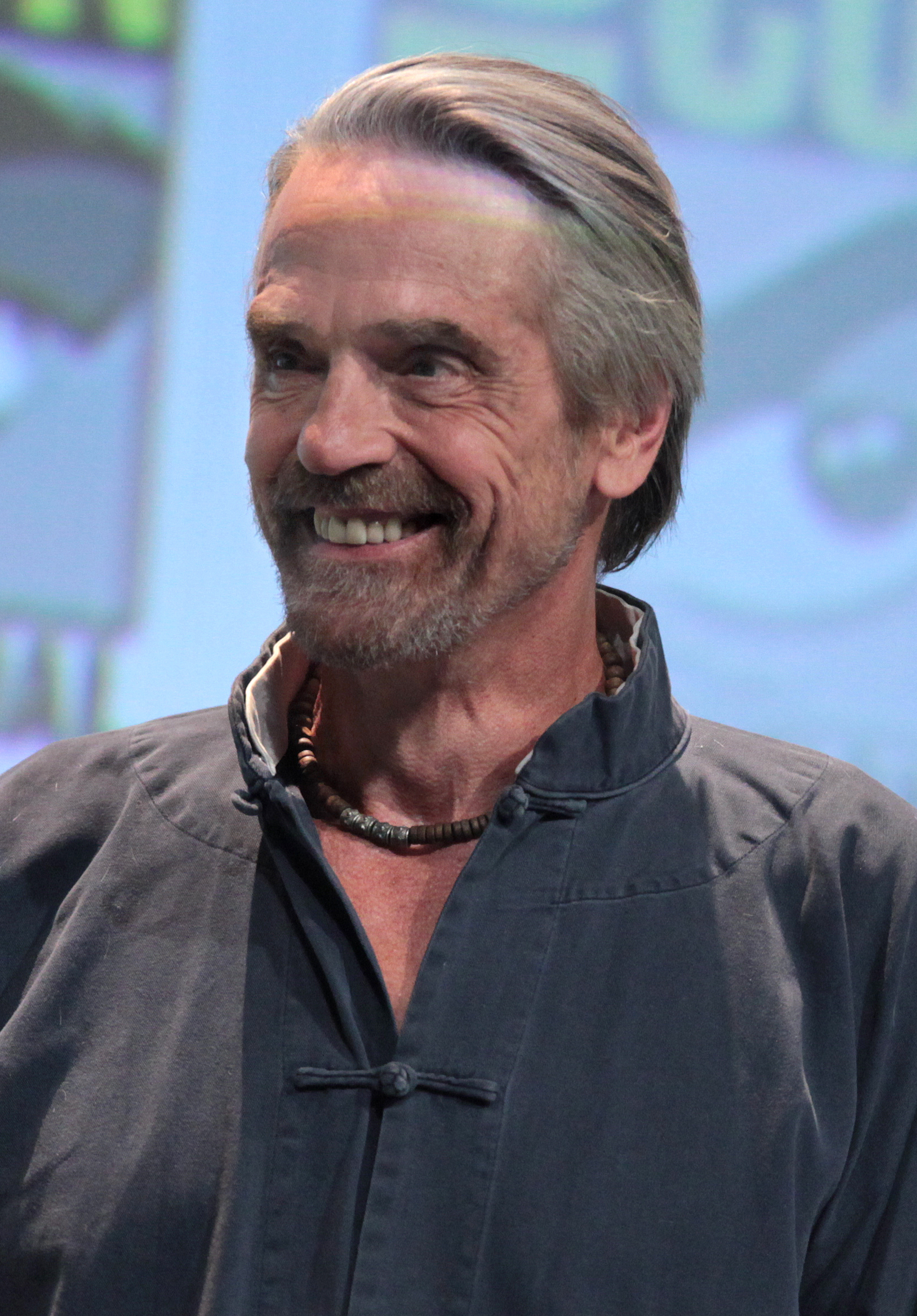
Leading English actor Jeremy Irons

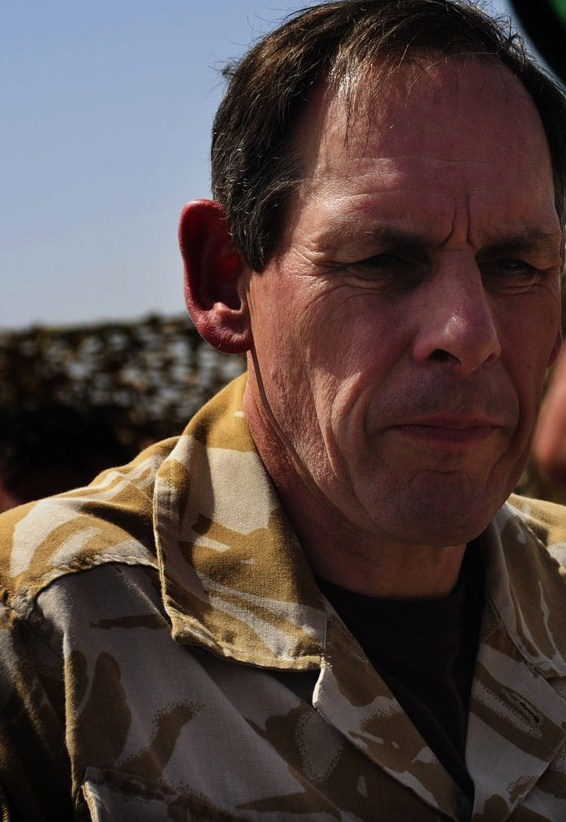
British military commander, former Commander Land Forces General Sir Nicholas Parker

- Alan Turing, mathematician, instrumental figure at Bletchley Park, father of Artificial Intelligence and the first modern computer.
- Alfred North Whitehead, mathematician and philosopher
- F. Sherwood Taylor chemist, Curator of the Museum of the History of Science, Oxford and Director of the Science Museum
- Francis John Lys, Provost of Worcester College, and Vice-Chancellor of the University of Oxford
- Harold Temperley, historian and former Master of Peterhouse, Cambridge
- John Newsom-Davis, neurologist
- Michael McCrum, former Headmaster of Eton College, former Master of Corpus Christi College, Cambridge and Vice-Chancellor of Cambridge University until 2004.
- Richard Atkinson, prehistorian and archeologist
- Timothy Garton Ash, historian and author
- Sir Colin Lucas, former Master of Balliol College and Vice-Chancellor of Oxford University until 2001.
- Sir Derman Christopherson, former Vice-Chancellor of Durham University and Master of Magdalene College, Cambridge
- Sir Malcolm Pasley Bt, literary scholar
- Dr John Boys Smith, Master of St John's College, Cambridge and Vice-Chancellor, University of Cambridge
- Hugh Thomas, Lord Thomas of Swynnerton, historian
- Gerald Heard, philosopher, and novelist

== Entertainment and the arts ==
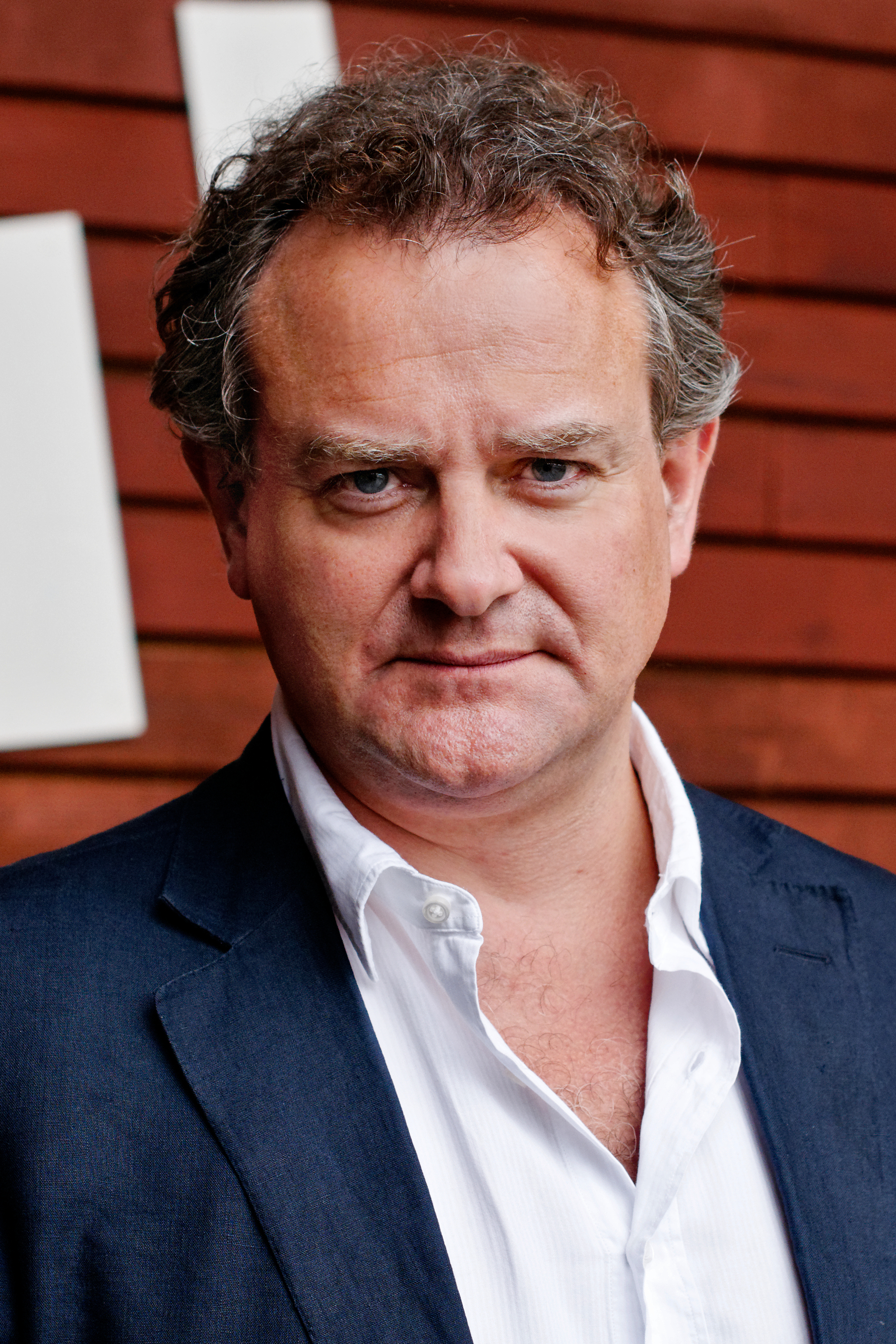
Actor best known for his roles in Downton Abbey and the Paddington films Hugh Bonneville

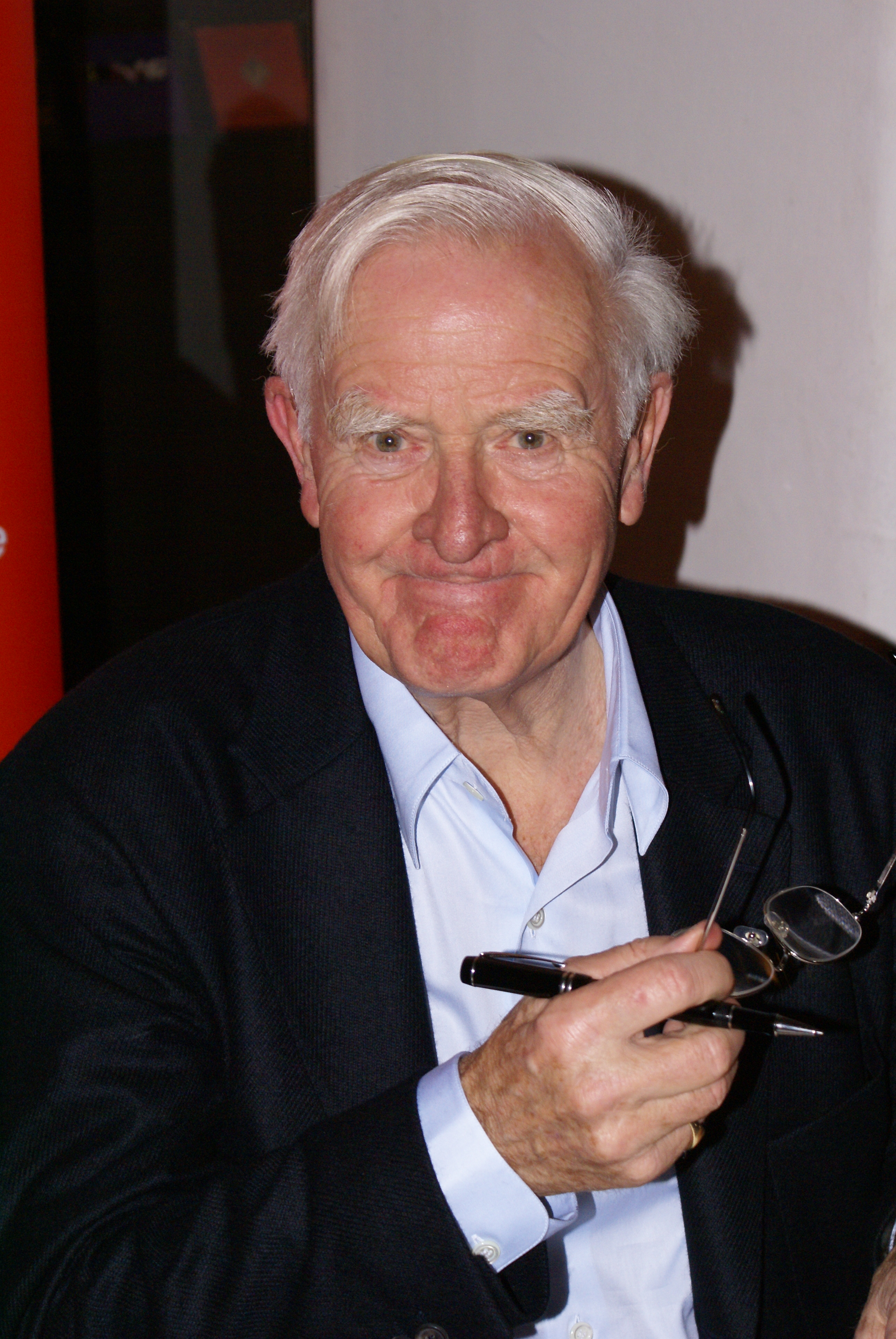
Writer David Cornwell better known by his pen name John le Carré

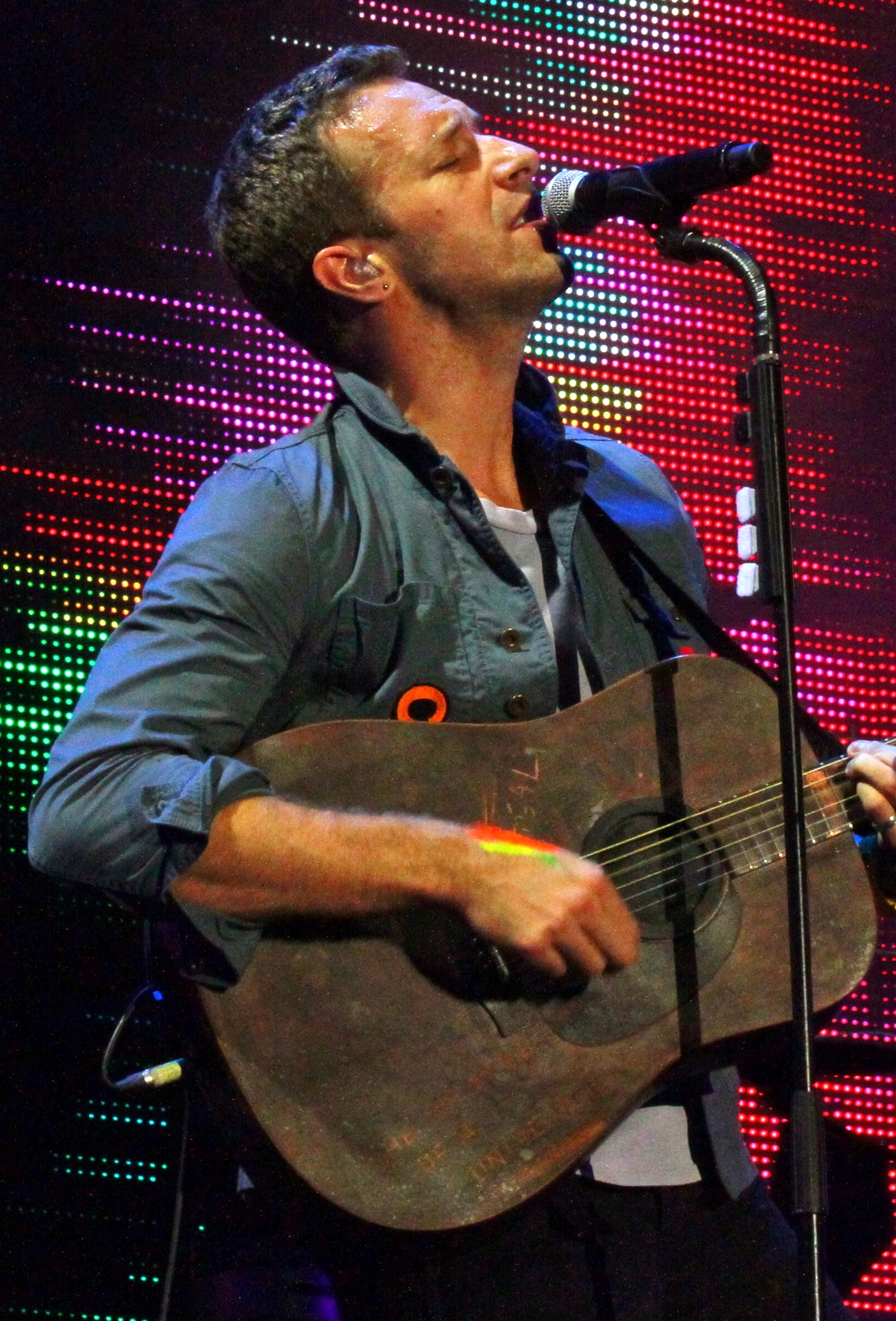
Lead singer and co-founder of the rock band Coldplay Chris Martin

- Hugh Bonneville, actor - Downton Abbey, Paddington
- Christopher Bowerbank, architect and raconteur
- Clive Carey, baritone singer and composer
- Charles Collingwood, actor
- Charlie Cox, actor - Daredevil
- Sir Richard Eyre, film and theatre director, artistic director of the National Theatre 1988–97
- Phil Harvey, manager and creative director of rock band Coldplay.
- Sir Michael Hopkins, architect
- Jeremy Irons, actor - Reversal of Fortune, The Lion King
- Rupert Maas English painting specialist & gallery owner
- Chris Martin, lead singer of rock band Coldplay
- Ian Messiter, creator of Just a Minute
- John Le Mesurier, actor, for example in Dad's Army
- Herbert Arnould Olivier, artist
- Lance Percival, actor
- Jon Pertwee, actor
- Jonathan Powell, Controller of BBC One (1987–1992)
- Albert Reginald Powys, architect and longtime Secretary of the Society for the Protection of Ancient Buildings
- James Purefoy, actor
- Roland Young, actor

== Military ==
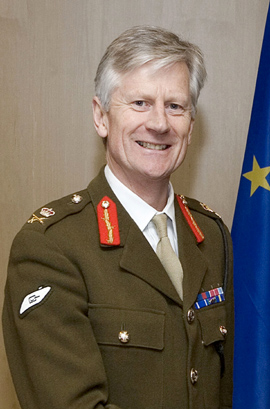
Director General of the European Union Military Staff Lieutenant General David Leakey

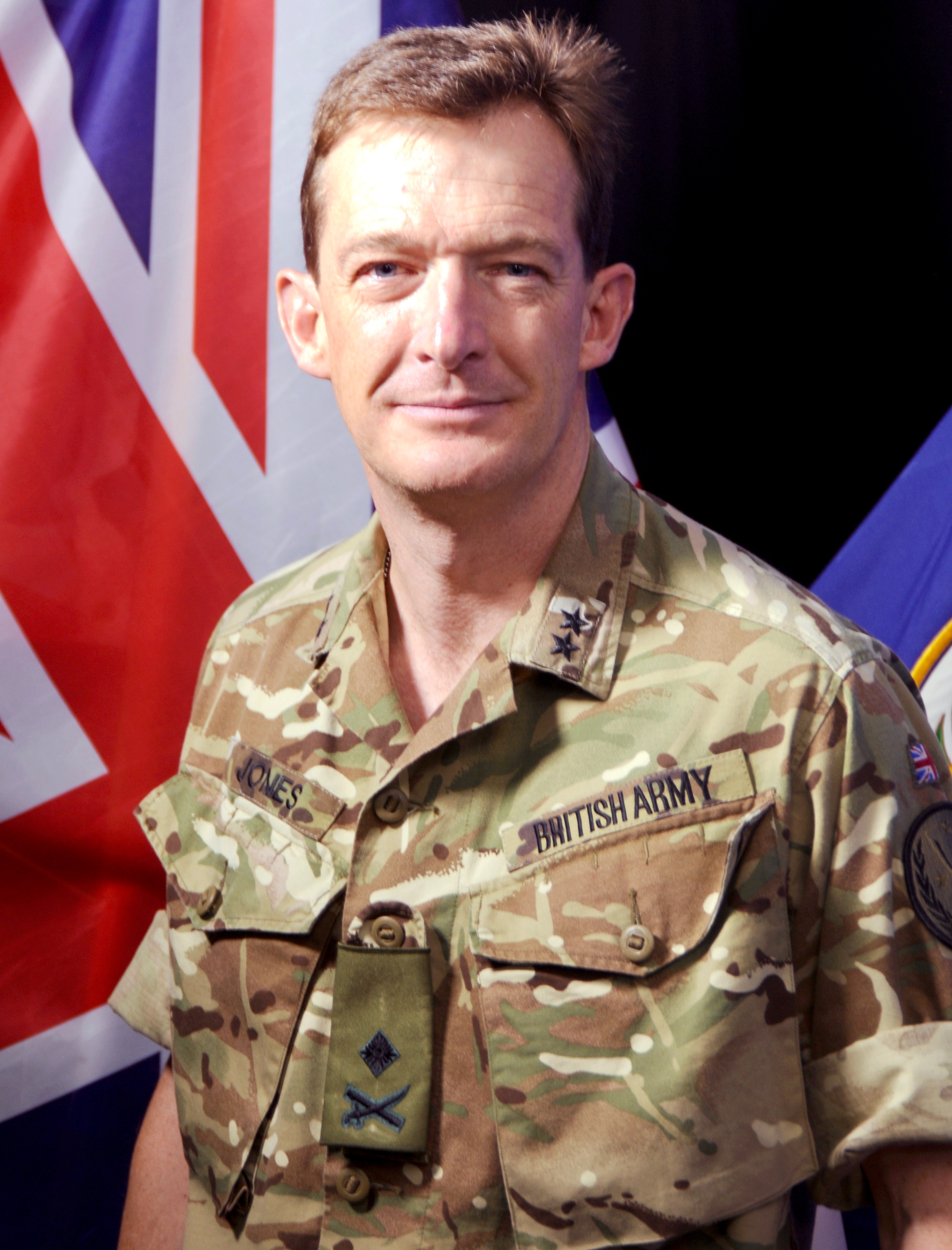
Standing Joint Force Commander since November 2018 Major General Rupert Jones

- Admiral Sir Horace Law, Commander in Chief Naval Home Command 1971–1972
- Admiral Sir James Perowne, Deputy Supreme Allied Commander Europe 1998–2002
- Brigadier Hugh Bellamy, commander of 6th Airlanding Brigade during the Rhine Crossing and Operation Varsity, the famous airborne assault.
- Captain Keith Muspratt, World War One flying ace
- Field Marshal Sir Claud Jacob, WW1 Commander
- Flight Lieutenant Carl Raymond Davis, Battle of Britain flying ace
- General Sir Charles Monro, 1st Baronet, Commander in Chief India 1916–1920, Governor of Gibraltar 1923–1928
- General Sir Jeremy Blacker, Master-General of the Ordnance 1991–1995
- General Sir John Wilsey, Commander in Chief Land Command 1995–1996
- General Sir Nicholas Parker, former Commander in Chief Land Command and former Deputy Commander of the International Security Assistance Force in Afghanistan
- Vice Admiral Andrew Burns, former Fleet Commander 2021–2025
- Lieutenant Colonel Reginald Applin, developer of machine gun tactics and Conservative MP.
- Lieutenant Colonel Timothy Spicer, CEO of Aegis Defence Services
- Lieutenant General David Leakey, retired, former Gentleman Usher of the Black Rod 2010–2018
- Lieutenant General Sir Martin Garrod, former Commandant General Royal Marines 1987–1990
- Lieutenant General Sir Steuart Pringle, former Commandant General Royal Marines until 1984
- Major General Julian Thompson, Commander of Royal Marines (3 Commando Brigade) in the Falklands War
- Major General Patrick Cordingley, Commander Desert Rats (and overall British Commander) in the Gulf War
- Major General Sir Iain Mackay-Dick, former Major-General Commanding the Household Division and General Officer Commanding London District
- Major General Sir Roy Redgrave, former Commander of British Forces in Hong Kong
- Major General Rupert Jones, Deputy Commander Operation Inherent Resolve 2016–2017

== Intelligence ==
- Sir Christopher Curwen, British Intelligence Officer & former Head of the Secret Intelligence Service (MI6).
- Sir David Spedding, former Head of the Secret Intelligence Service (MI6)

== Diplomacy and colonial administration ==
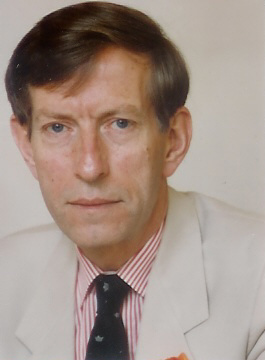
UK Permanent Representative on the North Atlantic Council (NATO) and then United Nations (UN) Sir John Weston

- Sir Alan Campbell, diplomat
- Sir Brian Barder, former UK High Commissioner to Australia
- Sir Donald MacGillivray, last British High Commissioner in Malaya
- Sir Hugh Norman-Walker, colonial administrator
- Sir John Weston, former UK Permanent Representative to the United Nations
- Sir Timothy Daunt, former UK Ambassador to Turkey and current Lieutenant Governor of the Isle of Man
- Charles Bathurst, 1st Viscount Bledisloe, former Governor-General of New Zealand.

== Clergymen ==
- Reverend Edwin Curtis, former Archbishop of the Indian Ocean
- Reverend Rico Tice, priest and writer
- Reverend David Sheppard, Baron Sheppard of Liverpool, well-known former Bishop of Liverpool and England cricketer
- Reverend Forbes Horan, former Bishop of Tewkesbury
- Reverend Geoffrey Lunt, former Bishop of Ripon
- Reverend Henry Henn, former Bishop of Burnley
- Reverend Henry Whitehead, former Bishop of Madras
- Reverend Neville Lovett, former Bishop of Salisbury
- Reverend Paul Barber, former Bishop of Brixworth
- Reverend Peter Mumford former Bishop of Truro 1981-9
- Reverend Piers Holt Wilson, former Bishop of Moray, Ross and Caithness 1943–52
- Arthur William Upcott, eminent priest and educationalist, and Archdeacon of Hastings 1920–22.
- Reverend Benjamin Lewers, former Provost of Derby Cathedral
- Reverend Frank Bennett, former Dean of Chester and eminent Anglican scholar
- Reverend David Payne

== Broadcasting ==
- Tom Bradby, TV journalist and ITV News Political Editor
- Alistair Bunkall, TV journalist and Sky News Defence Correspondent
- Simon McCoy, TV journalist and BBC News news presenter
- Philip Short, TV journalist at BBC News and author
- Nick Thorpe, TV, radio and print journalist, and BBC News Central Europe Correspondent (1996–); formerly BBC Budapest Correspondent

== Politics ==
- William Cecil, 2nd Earl of Salisbury, 18th Century politician
- Alan Lennox-Boyd, 1st Viscount Boyd of Merton, Secretary of State for the Colonies 1954-9
- Charles Beauclerk, Earl of Burford, peer
- Thomas Buchanan, Under-Secretary of State for India 1908-9
- Sir Christopher Chataway, long-distance runner and Education Minister 1962–4.
- Andrew Duff, Former MEP
- William Forsyth, Former Conservative MP
- Denzil Freeth, Former Conservative MP
- Aidan Hartley, Kenya-born journalist, author and film-maker
- Stanley Johnson, politician, writer, farmer and father of Boris Johnson
- Robert Key. Former Member of Parliament.
- Michael Marsham, 7th Earl of Romney (1910-2004), hereditary peer who served in the House of Lords.
- Peter Oborne, journalist, author and political commentator
- John Pardoe, Former Liberal MP
- Mark Todd, Former Labour MP
- Paul Tyler, Baron Tyler of Linkinhorne, Former Liberal MP and Chairman

== Writers and poets ==
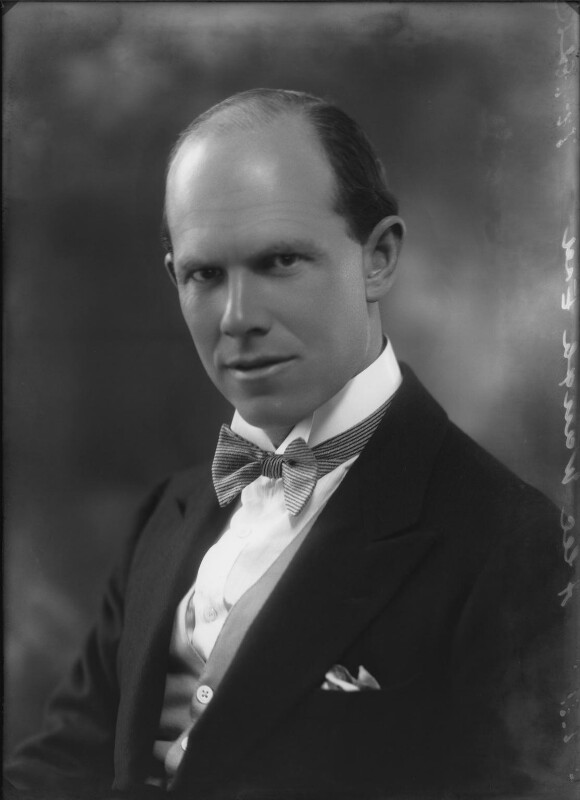
Novelist, elder brother of Evelyn Waugh and son of Arthur Waugh OS Alec Waugh

- Alec Waugh, author
- Anthony Lane, film critic
- Anthony Summers, author and Pulitzer Prize finalist
- Arnaldo Cortesi, journalist and Pulitzer Prize winner
- Arthur Waugh, author, critic and publisher
- Cecil Day-Lewis, poet
- David Cornwell, (a.k.a. John le Carré), writer, for example of Tinker, Tailor, Soldier, Spy
- John Cowper Powys, author, lecturer and philosopher
- Jon Stock, journalist and author
- Robert McCrum, writer and editor
- Tim Heald, journalist and author
- Warren Chetham-Strode, author and playwright

== Sport ==
- James Adams, cricketer
- John Bain (1854–1929), England footballer and 1877 FA Cup Finalist
- Peter Donald, cricketer
- David Fursdon, cricketer and current Lord-Lieutenant of Devon
- Mervin Glennie, cricketer
- Ted Glover, cricketer
- Nick Greenstock, former England Rugby Union centre
- George Hargrave, cricketer
- Will Homer, rugby union
- Tom James, rugby union
- Robin Kreyer, cricketer
- Sir Francis Lacey, cricketer and Secretary of the MCC
- Jeremy Quinlan, cricketer
- Justin Ricketts, cricketer
- Robert Rydon, cricketer
- Ollie Sale, cricketer
- John Tallent, former England International and RFU President
- Sir Hugh Vincent, rugby player (Wales)
- Algernon Whiting, cricketer

== Other ==
- Sir Nathaniel Highmore, Government barrister and civil servant
- Sir Alastair Pilkington, director of the Bank of England
- Sir Thomas Villiers, businessman and politician prominent in Ceylon
- Sir Geoffrey Briggs, Chief Justice of Brunei and of Hong Kong, 1973-9
- Lieutenant Commander Peter Twiss first person to exceed 1,000 miles per hour
- Mack Rutherford, youngest person to fly solo around the world
- Charles Palmer, engineer and survivor of the siege of Lucknow
- King Mswati III, king of Swaziland. Attended Sherborne International College
- His Highness Sheikh Tamim bin Hamad Al Thani, Emir of Qatar. Attended Sherborne International College
- Ronald Cunningham, (a.k.a. The Great Omani), escapologist
- Nigel Dempster, journalist
- Franklin Adin Simmonds, orthopaedic surgeon
- John Insall, American, orthopaedic surgeon
- Frederick Slessor, railway engineer
- Tengku Hassanal Ibrahim, regent and crown prince of Pahang, Malaysia
- James Daunt, founder of Daunt Books

== Victoria Cross holders ==
Five Old Shirburnians have been awarded the Victoria Cross, to whom a memorial plaque was commissioned, the unveiling of which took place in the School Chapel on 19 September 2004.

- Rear Admiral Henry James Raby – VC won in the Crimean War, when he was a lieutenant in the Naval Brigade. Raby was the first man to actually receive the medal, with Queen Victoria pinning it onto him in the first investiture.
- Brigadier General Sir Arthur George Hammond – VC won in the Second Afghan War, when he was a captain in the Bengal Staff Corps, Indian Army
- Major General Charles Edward Hudson – VC won in the First World War, when he was a temporary lieutenant colonel in the Sherwood Foresters
- Major Edward Bamford – VC won in the First World War, when he was a captain in the Royal Marine Light Infantry
- Captain John Hollington Grayburn – VC granted posthumously and he was gazetted captain; won in the Second World War, as a lieutenant in the Parachute Regiment

== See also ==
- Christopher Morcom, student athlete, astronomer, and notable childhood friend of Alan Turing, who graduated posthumously
- Notable Old Shirburnians born in the 8th to 17th centuries
- Notable Old Shirburnians born in the 18th century
- Notable Old Shirburnians born in the 19th century
