= Ellison–Cliffe Lecture =

The Ellison–Cliffe Lecture is held annually by the Royal Society of Medicine. The lecture series, which commenced in 1987 is named after Percy Cliffe and his wife, Carice Ellison, who endowed the lecture to be given on a subject connected with the contribution of fundamental science to the advancement of medicine.

The Lecturer is also awarded a medal in honour for their presentation.

== The Lectures ==
- 1987 Sir Walter Bodmer, on Genetics and Cancer
- 1988 Charles D. Marsden
- 1989 Dame Anne McLaren, on human conceptus
- 1990 Sir Roy Calne
- 1991 Lord George Porter
- 1992 Sir Joseph Smith, on the Threat of new Infectious Diseases
- 1993 Sir Colin Blakemore
- 1994 Sir James Black
- 1995 Dennis Lincoln
- 1996 Roger H. Clarke, on Managing Radiation Risks
- 1997 John Newsom-Davis
- 1998 Marcus Pembrey
- 1999 William P. Gray
- 2000 Richard Frackowiak
- 2001 A. Riley
- 2002 A. Smith
- 2003 Stephen T. Holgate CBE
- 2004 Dame Julia Polak, on embryonic stem cells and tissue engineering
- 2005 Iain Hutchison
- 2006 Jill Belch, Blood vessels: Not merely plumbing
- 2007 Tony Ryan, on nanotechnology and the quest for motility
- 2008 Chris Lavy
- 2009 Andy Adam
- 2010 Hugh Montgomery
- 2011 Kevin Warwick, Neural Interfaces: An experimental tour
- 2012 Kevin Fong, on Medicine for Mars
- 2013 Philip Beales
- 2014 Michael Hastings, on circadian body clocks
- 2015 Paul Freemont, life is what you make it
- 2016 Carl Philpott, Smell and taste - the senses that man forgot
- 2017 Charles Swanton, Cancer evolution through space and time - The challenge of prolonging survival
- 2018 Mustafa Suleyman, How AI is going to impact healthcare in the future
- 2019 Guy Leschziner, Sleep medicine
- 2021 Mark Lythgoe, The limits of perception: advances in biomedical imaging
- 2024 Christopher Bishop, Artificial intelligence in science and medicine

== See also ==
- List of medicine awards
