= John Rothwell =

John Rothwell may refer to:

- John Rothwell (cricketer), Australian cricketer
- John Rothwell (physiologist), professor of neurophysiology
- John Rothwell (hurler) (born 1951), Irish retired hurler
- Arthur Uther Pendragon (John Timothy Rothwell, born 1954), English eco-campaigner, neo-druid leader, media personality, and self-declared reincarnation of King Arthur
