= Hugh Montgomery (physician) =

English physician

Hugh Montgomery OBE
- Born: Hugh Edward Montgomery; 20 October 1962 (age 64)
- Education: Middlesex Hospital Medical School
- Known for: "Fitness gene": Royal Institution Christmas lecturer (2007)
- Scientific career
- Fields: Medicine, climate change
- Workplaces: University College London
- Website: twitter.com/hugh_montgomery

Hugh Edward Montgomery OBE (born 20 October 1962) is an English professor of medicine and the director of the Centre for Human Health and Performance at University College London. He discovered that an allele of the gene with the DNA code for angiotensin-converting enzyme (ACE) influences physical fitness; this was the first discovery of a gene related to fitness.

== Academic career ==
Montgomery was educated at Plymouth College. He obtained a 1st Class BSc degree in 1984 in neuropharmacology and cardiorespiratory physiology, before qualifying as a medical doctor in July 1987 from the Middlesex Hospital Medical School, University of London. He was awarded the prize as most outstanding student during this time. In 1997, he was awarded his higher research degree (MDRes) for work on paracrine renin-angiotensin systems. He now directs the UCL centre for Human Health and Performance. He has authored nearly 500 research papers in journals such as Nature, The Lancet and the New England Journal of Medicine. and has received 11 national and international awards. His work has ranged from the development and application of gene-environment interaction studies (reporting the 'first gene for human physical performance'), to population genetic studies (being amongst the first to identify signatures of selection for high altitude amongst Tibetans) and work in artificial intelligence. He was research lead for the 2008 Xtreme Everest research expedition. He co-chairs the Lancet Countdown on Health and Climate Change, having co-chaired several previous commissions on the subject.

He is a professor of Intensive Care Medicine at UCL and practises as a consultant in critical care at the Whittington Hospital in north London.

Montgomery was appointed Officer of the Order of the British Empire (OBE) in the 2022 New Year Honours for services to intensive care medicine and climate change.

== Covid-19 pandemic ==
Montgomery is an established and outspoken critic of people taking public healthcare risks during the COVID-19 pandemic. He aired his concerns publicly during the first wave of COVID-19 infections both in the UK and Australia. During these televised interviews he answered questions and issued advice on the subject.

During the UK's second wave of COVID-19 cases, in interviews with the BBC Radio 5 Live and Channel 4 news, Montgomery strongly criticized the public for not practising social distancing and wearing masks, declaring them as "having blood on their hands".

== Climate change ==
Since 1998, Montgomery has been active in trying to address the health impacts of climate change. He initiated the First Lancet Commission on the subject in 2008, and led the first international conference on its health and security implications. He co-chairs the annual 47-country Lancet Countdown on Health & Climate Change. He has written and lectured extensively on the subject; has briefed policymakers (inter)nationally; and co-leads the UCL MSc module on climate and health. He sits on University College London's 'Climate Change' Grand Challenge Steering Committee, and co-leads Sustainability for the UK Intensive Care Society. He was appointed London Leader by Greater London Authority’s Sustainable Development Commission; has attended many of the international ‘COP’ negotiations; founded the children’s climate education ‘Project Genie’; and co-led the ITV documentary, Floods and Climate Change (2020). He was awarded the OBE in 2022 in part for his work on climate change and health. In 2024, he founded the non-profit Real Zero, helping to reduce emissions through activity in the health sector.

== Other interests ==
Montgomery held a Cat X skydiving qualification, and also an HSE Pt IV commercial diving licence. He is a keen snorkeller and mountain walker, and has climbed in the Himalaya (Cho Oyu, 8201m, 2006; Pumori), the European Alps, and the Andes (Aconcagua, 6997m).

Montgomery has been awarded the title of London Leader by the London Sustainable Development Commission for his work in climate change and health under the auspices of Project Genie; he was also a founding member of the UK Climate and Health Council and one of the co-authors of the UCL-Lancet Commission in 2009. Montgomery has complemented his interest in fitness with achievements which include the 100 km ultra marathons, holding the world record for underwater piano playing as well as visiting Everest with the Xtreme Everest research group to undertake research.

He was the co-editor-in-chief of the Open Access journal Extreme Physiology & Medicine published by BioMed Central.

Montgomery is the author of the children's book The Voyage of the Arctic Tern. He has also authored the children's book Cloudsailors and, in 2019, the medical thriller 'Control', described by Lynda la Plante as 'A suspenseful and frightening medical thriller'.

He is an inventor, holding patents relating to new uses for renin-angiotensin antagonists in metabolic regulation; for a new fluid delivery device; and for a new asthma inhaler device.

== Awards and honours ==
- 2007 Presented the televised annual Royal Institution Christmas Lectures on the subject Back from the brink: the science of survival.
- 2010 Chosen to present the Ellison-Cliffe Lecture at the Royal Society of Medicine.
- 1996 British Cardiac Society Young Investigators Award
- 1997 Martii Karvonen Young Investigator Award (Pujko Symposium, Finland)
- 2001 European Society of Cardiology Medal for Basic Science
- 2002 Euro Society for Clin Invest: Award for Excellence in Clinical Investigation
- 2002 Intensive Care Society Gillian Hanson Lecture and Award
- 2010 Hull Grundy Lectureship and Medal (RCP/ RAMC)
- 2010 Edinburgh Royal College of Physicians Honeyman Gillespie Lecture
- 2010 Royal Society of Medicine Elison Cliffe Lecture
- 2011 The Galton Lecture and Award (Galton Society)
- 2014 European Society of Anaesthesia ‘Draeger’ Prize (best critical care paper of the last year)
- 2022 Elected Fellow of the Academy of Medical Sciences

He appeared on BBC Radio 4's Desert Island Discs in 2014, and was the subject of The Life Scientific in 2012.
