= Julia Polak =

British pathologist

Dame Julia Margaret Polak (26 June 1939 – 11 August 2014) was an Argentine-born British pathologist who lived in England. She was head of the Centre for Tissue Engineering and Regenerative Medicine at Imperial College London, a centre for medical research she set up with Larry Hench, also from Imperial College, to develop cells and tissues for transplantation into humans.

== Biography ==
Julia Polak was born in Buenos Aires, Argentina, daughter of Carlos Polak, a judge, and writer Rebeca Mactas Alpersohn. Her family was Jewish, and had fled persecution in Eastern Europe. She was educated at the University of Buenos Aires, before moving to London. She was married to a fellow student, Daniel Catovsky, and had three children. Her grand-niece is American model and actress Camila Morrone.

Polak was one of the longest surviving recipients of a heart and lung transplant in the United Kingdom. It was her transplant in 1995 which caused her to change her career direction from pathology towards the newly developing field of tissue engineering.

She was editor of the journal, Tissue Engineering, as well as a member of the MRC/UK Stem Cell Bank Clinical and User Liaison Committee and an advisor to the Science and Parliament Committees. She was recognized as one of the most highly cited and influential researchers in her field.

Her work was recognized by the Society for Endocrinology, the International Academy of Pathology and the Association of Clinical Pathologists. She received funding through the Texas/United Kingdom Collaborative Research Initiative in Biosciences.

Polak died on 11 August 2014, aged 75, from undisclosed causes.

== Awards and honours ==
In the 2003 Queen's Birthday Honours, she was made Dame Commander of the Order of the British Empire (DBE) for her services to medicine. She was elected a Fellow of the Academy of Medical Sciences in 1999. In 2004, she received the Ellison-Cliffe Medal from the Royal Society of Medicine.
