= Charles Swanton =

British physician scientist (born 1972)

Charles Swanton FRS FMedSci FRCP
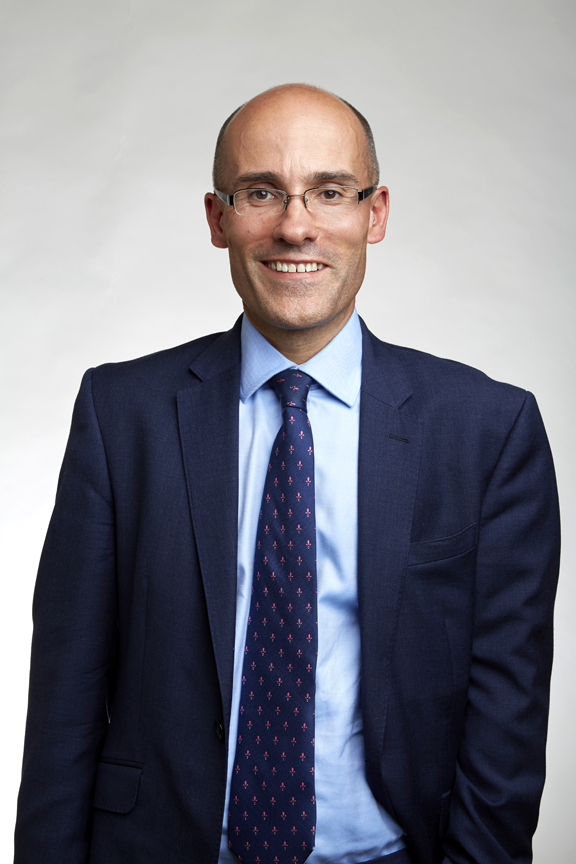
- Swanton in 2018
- Born: Robert Charles Swanton; 1972 (age 53–54); Poole, Dorset, England, UK
- Education: St Paul's School, London
- Alma mater: University College London (MD, PhD)
- Awards: Ellison–Cliffe Lecture (2017); EMBO Member (2017)
- Scientific career
- Fields: Cancer evolution
- Workplaces: Francis Crick Institute; University College London
- Thesis: Viral cyclin disruption of mammalian cell cycle control mechanisms (1998)
- Doctoral advisor: Nic Jones
- Website: www.crick.ac.uk/research/a-z-researchers/researchers-p-s/charles-swanton/

Robert Charles Swanton is a British physician scientist specialising in oncology and cancer research. Swanton is a senior group leader at London's Francis Crick Institute, Royal Society Napier Professor in Cancer and thoracic medical oncologist at University College London and University College London Hospitals, co-director of the Cancer Research UK (CRUK) Lung Cancer Centre of Excellence, and Chief Clinician of Cancer Research UK. He has served on the Novartis Board of Directors since 2026.

== Early life and education ==
Swanton was born in Poole, Dorset. As of 2017, his father Robert Howard Swanton (MD, FRCP) was a consultant cardiologist at UCL.

Swanton was educated at St Paul's School, London and completed his PhD in 1999 at what was then the Imperial Cancer Research Fund Laboratories (now the Francis Crick Institute) and his Cancer Research UK clinician scientist/medical oncology training in 2008.

== Career ==
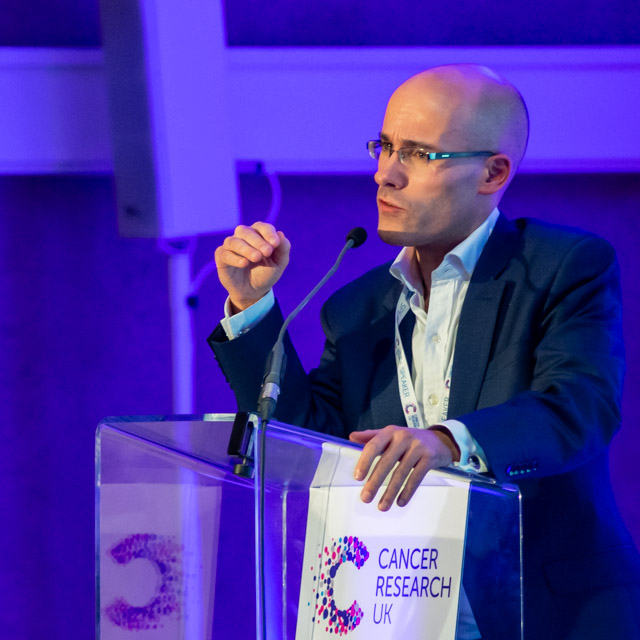
Professor Swanton speaking at a conference in 2015

Swanton has combined his laboratory research with clinical duties as co-director of the CRUK Lung Cancer Centre, focussed on how tumours evolve over space and time. He has helped to define the branched evolutionary histories of solid tumours, processes that drive cancer cell-to-cell variation in the form of new cancer mutations or chromosomal instabilities, and the impact of such cancer diversity on effective immune surveillance and clinical outcome.

From 2018 - 2025, Swanton was a co-founder of Achilles Therapeutics with Sergio Quezada, Karl Peggs and Mark Lowdell. Achilles Therapeutics is a UCL/CRUK and Francis Crick Institute biotechnology company funded by Syncona that develops adoptive T cell therapies targeting clonal/truncal neo-antigens present in every tumour cell to limit drug resistance and tumour evolution.

=== Awards and honours ===
- 1997: Imperial Cancer Research Fund's (ICRF) Pontecorvo PhD thesis prize
- 2011: Fellow of the Royal College of Physicians (FRCP)
- 2014: Jeremy Jass Prize in pathology
- 2015: Fellow of the Academy of Medical Sciences (FMedSci)
- 2015: Stand up to Cancer Translational Cancer Research Prize
- 2016: Glaxo Smithkline Biochemical Society Prize
- 2016: San Salvatore prize for Cancer Research
- 2017: CRUK Translational Research Prize in 2017,
- 2017: EMBO Member in 2017
- 2017: Ellison-Cliffe Medal by the Royal Society of Medicine
- 2018: Elected a Fellow of the Royal Society (FRS)
- 2018: Massachusetts General Hospital Cancer Centre Kraft Prize
- 2018: Gordon Hamilton Fairley Medal and Lecture
- 2019: ESMO Translational Research Award
- 2020: Addario Lung Cancer Foundation Award and Lecture
- 2021: Weizmann Institute - Sergio Lambroso Award in Cancer Research
- 2021: Paul Marks Prize for Cancer Research
- 2024: Louis-Jeantet Prize for Medicine.
- 2026: The Sjöberg prize.
