= The Voyage of the Arctic Tern =

Children's novel by Hugh Montgomery

- First edition - self published
- Author: Hugh Montgomery
- Illustrator: Nick Poullis
- Publication date: June 3, 2002
- ISBN: 978-0-744-59251-1

The Voyage of the Arctic Tern is a children's verse novel written by Hugh Montgomery and illustrated by Nick Poullis. It tells the story of an ancient ship and its captain, who seeks redemption because he has been cursed with eternal life.

The Voyage of the Arctic Tern was Montgomery's first book. Initially self-published, it won Book of the Year and Poetry Book of the Year at the David St. John Thomas Charitable Trust Self-Publishing Awards in 2000. It was then published in 2002 by Candlewick Press (U.S) and Walker Books Ltd (UK, Australia), and republished in 2003 by Walker Books Ltd.

== Plot summary ==
In an ancient Northern European village near the Arctic, a fisherman named Bruno betrays his fellow villagers to a band of marauders, led by a man called the "Mad Dog." Everyone else in the village dies as a result. Guilt-ridden, Bruno tries to drown himself. But the ghosts of the dead villagers appear and stop him. They curse Bruno with eternal life, dooming him to sail his ship the Arctic Tern forevermore, unless he achieves three tasks: save a friend's life, rescue a man from betrayal, and give a great treasure away to the needy.

In the 17th century, while out at sea, Bruno rescues an injured Englishman named Admiral Hunter. Hunter is the only survivor of a ship attacked by the pirates, led by the evil Spanish nobleman Lord "Mad Dog" Morgan. Morgan is also the trusted adviser of the King of Spain, but he secretly plans to seize the kingdom for himself.

When the Queen of England commands Admiral Hunter to deliver a peace treaty to Spain, Bruno joins Hunter's delegation to the King of Spain. The other members of the delegation are Bruno's trusted friends, Dr. Chris Edge of Oxford, and a young barman from Plymouth named Adrian.

They sail off for Spain and arrive just in time to save the King of Spain, whom Morgan has been poisoning with arsenic-laced wine. Dr. Edge cures the King. Lord Morgan is captured and banished from the kingdom. The King rewards the English delegation with the signed peace treaty and a large chest filled with silver coins.

Then Morgan and his men steal the treasure chest and escape aboard their pirate ship. Bruno and his friends chase Morgan's ship with the Arctic Tern, driving it all the way to Heybrook Bay, near Plymouth, England. Defeated, Morgan destroys his own ship, taking himself and the treasure down with it. Bruno thinks he sees Morgan transform into a large octopus before disappearing completely.

Over the next few centuries, Bruno worries that the great treasure is lost forever to the deep.

But by the 1960s, in the modern coastal city of Plymouth, a young doctor named Chris Edge arrives for a holiday. He feels the urge to enter an old pub. Coincidentally, a young naval officer named Steve Hunter also goes into the same pub. Both Chris and Steve see a barman at work. For some reason, they know his name is Adrian. At one table sits an old sailor. It's Bruno. Bruno greets them; he invites them to sail on his ship, the Arctic Tern, to scuba-dive with him in the waters around Plymouth for the rest of their holiday. Steve, Chris and Adrian find themselves trusting him, and agree to his proposal.

After a week of diving, Steve, Chris, and Adrian discover a sunken 17th-century pirate's ship, standing upright on the sea floor, with a large treasure chest sitting on its deck. When they resurface and report this to Bruno, Bruno instructs his three friends to remain with the Arctic Tern. Then he dons his scuba gear, plunges into the water, and swims toward the ship. A large octopus with fiery eyes guards the treasure chest on the deck. Bruno wrestles with the octopus, kills it, and touches the silver coins in the chest. Immediately, Morgan's pirate ship crumbles to dust. Then Bruno, the treasure chest, and the Arctic Tern vanish.

Chris, Steve, and Adrian no longer remember how they each got safely home after this, nor can they remember anything about Bruno, the Arctic Tern, or the treasure. However, Adrian remains the barman of the old pub in Plymouth. On the darkest night of each winter, for reasons unknown, Adrian sets a table for thirteen meals. The next morning, those thirteen meals are always consumed, with a Spanish silver coin left sitting on top of the thirteenth plate. Adrian stores these coins in a stoneware jar. People who are weak, sick, or poor, may leave a note on the door of pub, pleading for help. When they do, a silver coin from the stoneware jar magically comes to them.

== Writing style and themes ==
The Voyage of the Arctic Tern is a work of historical fantasy told in verse form, with an alternate end rhyme scheme. Due to the length and intricacy of its plot, the story is divided into three "books" or chapters, and an epilogue.

The book is classified for children ages 9 and up. The story features ideas like reincarnation, and immortality as a curse. The battle between good and evil is presented as a choice between treachery and redemption.

== The author ==
Hugh Montgomery was born and raised in the coastal city of Plymouth, England. He developed a love for the sea early in life, inspired by his own grandfather, a former ship's captain.

As a boy, Montgomery learned how to snorkel and scuba dive. By his late teens he became part of the team of volunteer divers led by archaeologist Margaret Rule who salvaged the underwater wreck of King Henry VIII's warship, the Mary Rose, in the straits of the Solent, north of the Isle of Wight. Montgomery has said that he "used to disappear off for the diving seasons on the Rose, and they were some of the best [seasons] of my life." Many years later, after Montgomery had become a medical doctor and professor, his childhood and personal experiences with the Mary Rose project would serve as inspirations for the plot of The Voyage of the Arctic Tern.

Montgomery had originally set out to write The Voyage of the Arctic Tern as a Christmas present for his godchildren in 1993. However, he was already a busy consultant in the intensive care unit of University College London at that time. It took him three years to complete the story, writing parts of it in between seeing patients and leading a group of genetic researchers (the same team that eventually discovered the allele of the gene that influences human physical fitness, in 1998).

== The illustrations ==
Text illustrations appear on nearly all pages of the published versions of The Voyage of the Arctic Tern. These are pen and ink drawings by award-winning watercolor painter and artist Nicholas Poullis (credited as Nick Poullis for the book).

Originally from Amersham, Buckinghamshire in England, Nicholas Poullis is currently based in the Languedoc region of southern France. He has been a Baker Tilly Award winner at the Royal Watercolour Society, and an official painter to the Office de Tourisme of Pézenas.

The cover illustration for the book's 2002 and 2003 publications was done by Gary Blythe.

== Historical background and inspirations ==
As a historical fantasy, The Voyage of the Arctic Tern combines real-life phenomena, places, and people with fictional characters or elements.

While the specific location of the main character Bruno's ancient village is not explicitly mentioned, the description of its extremely cold winters, Northern Lights seen in the sky, and bright spring flowers growing on hard ground, matches the description of the climate and environment in the coastal areas of Scandinavia near the Arctic Circle. In addition, Bruno's ship (the Arctic Tern) is named after a bird commonly seen in that area. The story also mentions that the ship's name is carved upon "a plaque of Scandinavian pine."

Dr. Montgomery's childhood home of Plymouth and the surrounding waters served as the fictional character Bruno's main haunt. As in the story, the real Plymouth has a pub-hotel called the Admiral MacBride, which claims to be the city's oldest pub. The "Cap'n Jaspers" seaside food stall mentioned in the story also exists in real life; however it dates back only to the 1970s.

The capital where the King of Spain and Lord Morgan lived is the city of Seville. The city's Alcázar palace complex is the very same palace for the story's King; details from its architecture are featured in Poullis' illustrations. However, both the story's 17th-century King of Spain and Queen of England are unnamed fictional characters. There is no explicitly-given semblance between them and the actual monarchs who ruled these countries during that time.

Aside from showing various scenes from the story, various ships typical of early medieval to early 17th-century Europe are also featured in Poullis' drawings, including the ancient Norse knarr and the carrack.

The underwater wreck of Lord Morgan's ship in Heybrook Bay is patterned after Dr. Montgomery's experience of the 1970s archaeological underwater excavation and salvaging work on the Mary Rose, which was an example of a carrack warship.

A bit of the Mary Rose wreck's recent history is mentioned in the story, with a brief description of its first salvage attempt in the 19th century by brothers John and Charles Deane. Other real historical figures are also briefly mentioned in the story, such as 19th-century French microbiologist Louis Pasteur, and 20th-century French co-developers of the Aqua-Lung, Émile Gagnan and Jacques Cousteau.

The main fictional character of Bruno was inspired by a real-life diver of wrecks named Bruno, whom Montgomery had met while working on the Mary Rose project. Bruno also had a ship named the Arctic Tern. Other fictional characters such Lord Morgan, Steve Hunter, Chris Edge, and Adrian were loosely based on real people in Dr Montgomery's life. They are all mentioned in the author's acknowledgements at the end of the book.

== Reception ==
Montgomery initially tried submitting the finished manuscript of The Voyage of the Arctic Tern to many publishers. But after numerous rejections, he decided to publish the book himself. The self-published book was a success; all 2,000 self-published first copies were sold. It also won Book of the Year and Poetry Book of the Year at the UK's David St John Thomas Charitable Trust Self-Publishing Awards in 2000.

Upon its 2002 trade publishing, The Voyage of the Arctic Tern garnered general acclaim and a few mixed reviews. The UK's The Times called the book a "tour de force" and "a beautifully illustrated, completely accessible and highly atmospheric adventure story." The Sunday Times described it as "a cross between Watership Down and C. S. Lewis." Publishers Weekly called it "an epic poem that delivers a spine-tingling tale of treachery and redemption." Meanwhile, the American Kirkus Reviews gave a mixed review, saying that the story told in verse "doesn't exactly flow trippingly off the tongue" but that the "well-structured narrative and action moves seamlessly through the centuries" made it "a tale to remember." Children's Books Ireland described the story as "cumbersome" yet "engaging."
