= The Great Omani =

Ronald Cunningham (The Great Omani)
- Born: 10 July 1915; Windsor, England
- Died: 15 October 2007 (aged 92); Brighton, Sussex, England
- Occupation(s): escapologist and stunt performer
- Spouse: Eileen Cunningham

The Great Omani (10 July 1915 – 15 October 2007), real name Ronald Cunningham, was one of the oldest recorded escapologists and stuntmen.

The Great Omani was born in Windsor, Berkshire on 10 July 1915 the son of a wine importer and was educated at the Dorset public school Sherborne. When he left school he went into the family business however after his father died the company failed and was sold off. After being declined entry for army service in World War II due to a damaged heart he was curious about what to do with his life next. Browsing one day through a second hand book shop in Charing Cross Road, he fell upon a bookThe Secrets of Houdini by J.C. Cannell". The book was controversial due to its explanation of how the magic of the great escapologist Harry Houdini was performed, and The Magic Circle thought it would promote daring behaviour to try recreate these stunts. However this book inspired The Great Omani into the magic world and after experimental trials with underwater stunts, he was ready for public appearance in 1950.

He worked in Bognor Regis performing tricks in a straitjacket chained and padlocked to the legs of the pier as the tide rose. On Brighton's West Pier, The Great Omani was known for jumping though open flames into a bed of glass. In 1977 he marked the Queen's Silver Jubilee by performing a handstand on the cliff edge of Beachy Head, with a Union Jack between his toes.

To impress audiences he put himself in great danger during many of his stunts using fire, water and glass at his local pub the Bedford Tavern in Brighton. It was here where he performed his last stunt in 2005. This was the escape out of handcuffs with both arms on fire with lighter fluid.

He died in Brighton, East Sussex after a whisky and a cigar at his home on 15 October 2007. His last request was for a trapdoor in the hearse at his funeral. He wrote a short poem, which was read at the occasion:

They lay the Great Omani in his box / They have done it up with nails not locks / But at his funeral do not despair / Chances are he won't be there.

== Quotes ==
People will always flock to see anybody likely to kill themselves.

"It's a very hard profession to leave," he once explained. "I tell you why: I'm an exhibitionist".
