= Justin Ricketts =

English cricketer (born 1973)

Personal information
- Full name: Justin Donald Ricketts
- Born: 8 November 1973 (age 53); Salisbury, Wiltshire, England
- Batting: Right-handed
- Bowling: Leg break googly

Domestic team information
- Years: Team
- 1995: Oxford University

Career statistics
Competition	First-class
Matches	10
Runs scored	148
Batting average	14.80
100s/50s	–/1
Top score	63
Balls bowled	1,349
Wickets	17
Bowling average	43.05
5 wickets in innings	–
10 wickets in match	–
Best bowling	3/30
Catches/stumpings	3/–
- Source: Cricinfo, 24 April 2020

Justin Donald Ricketts (born 8 November 1973) is an English former first-class cricketer.

Ricketts was born at Salisbury in November 1973. He was educated at Sherborne School, before going up to Balliol College, Oxford. While studying at Oxford, he played first-class cricket for Oxford University in 1995, making ten appearances, one of which was The University Match against Cambridge at Lord's. In his ten matches, Ricketts scored a total of 148 run at an average of 14.80 and a high score of 63. With his leg break googly bowling, he took 17 wickets at a bowling average of 43.05 and best figures of 3 for 30. Ricketts later emigrated to Australia, where he is involved in business.
