= Jeremy Quinlan =

English cricketer (born 1965)

Personal information
- Full name: Jeremy David Quinlan
- Born: 18 April 1965 (age 61); Watford, Hertfordshire, England
- Batting: Right-handed
- Bowling: Right-arm medium

Domestic team information
- Years: Team
- 1985–1986: Oxford University
- 1985: Wiltshire

Career statistics
Competition	First-class
Matches	12
Runs scored	80
Batting average	10.00
100s/50s	–/–
Top score	24*
Balls bowled	1,755
Wickets	14
Bowling average	71.71
5 wickets in innings	–
10 wickets in match	–
Best bowling	4/76
Catches/stumpings	3/–
- Source: Cricinfo, 26 June 2019

Jeremy David Quinlan (born 18 April 1965) is an English former first-class cricketer.

Quinlan was born at Watford in April 1965. He was educated at Sherborne School, before going up to St Peter's College, Oxford. While studying at Oxford he made his debut in first-class cricket for Oxford University against Somerset at Oxford in 1985. He played eleven further first-class matches for Oxford, the last coming in 1986. In his twelve first-class matches, Quinlan scored a total of 80 runs with a high score of 24 not out. With his right-arm medium pace bowling, he took 14 wickets at an average of 71.71, with best figures of 4 for 76. In addition to playing first-class, Quinlan also played minor counties cricket for Wiltshire in 1985, making two appearances in the Minor Counties Championship.
