= John Rothwell (cricketer) =

Australian cricketer

Personal information
- Born: 1 October 1913; Hobart, Tasmania, Australia
- Died: 22 May 2005 (aged 91); Subiaco, Western Australia

Domestic team information
- Years: Team
- 1933/34: Tasmania
- Source: Cricinfo, 6 March 2016

John Rothwell (1 October 1913 – 22 May 2005) was an Australian cricketer. He played four first-class matches for Tasmania between 1933 and 1934.
