= Nick Thorpe =

British journalist

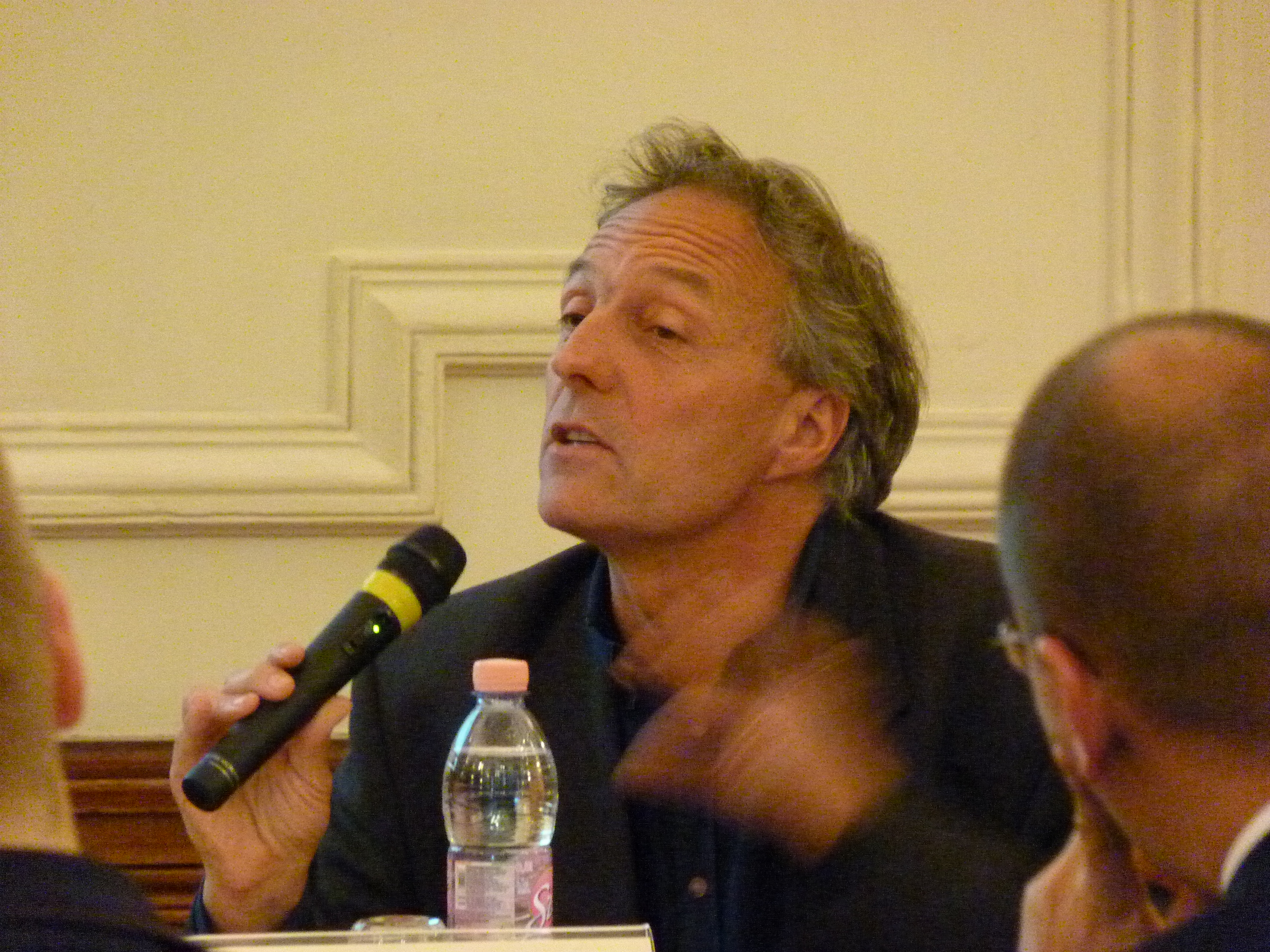
- Thorpe in Budapest in 2014
- Born: February 1960 (age 66); Upnor, Kent, England
- Education: Sherborne School
- Alma mater: University of Reading
- Occupations: Journalist, documentary filmmaker
- Employer: BBC
- Spouse: Andrea

Nick Thorpe (born February 1960) is a British journalist and documentary filmmaker who is the Central Europe Correspondent for BBC News, the main newsgathering department of the BBC, and its 24-hour television news channels BBC World News and BBC News Channel, as well as the BBC's domestic television and radio channels and the BBC World Service. He is based in Budapest and has over 40 years' experience of reporting for the BBC and United Kingdom newspapers, becoming BBC Budapest Correspondent in 1986. He became BBC Central Europe Correspondent in 1996.

== Journalism career ==
Thorpe joined the BBC in 1986 as Budapest Correspondent, and was the first Western correspondent to be based there, and has continued to report on Eastern Europe ever since. In 1989, he joined The Observer newspaper as its Eastern Europe Correspondent, returning to the BBC in 1996. He has also written for The Guardian and The Independent newspapers. He is responsible for covering Hungary, Romania, Bulgaria and other countries in the region, including the Balkans. He covered the fall of Communism, the collapse of Yugoslavia, and the EU membership process of many countries in the region. In April 2016, he was a co-recipient of the Peabody Awards, Public Service category, for his contributions to 'European Migrant Crisis/A New Life in Europe/The Year of Migration' (BBC News, BBC World Service, BBC Radio), with BBC colleagues James Reynolds, Fergal Keane, Neal Razzell, Richard Bilton, Quentin Sommerville, Maven Rana, Matthew Price, Damian Grammaticus, Gavin Hewitt, Jenny Hill and Edward Thomas.

== Film career ==
Thorpe is also a documentary film-maker. He co-directed, with Andrea Weichinger, 'The Fairy Island' (1993) for Duna Television in Hungary, and in 2001, 'The Vineleaf and the Rose' for MTV in Hungary, which won the Award for Best Cinematography at the Mediawave International Film Festival in the same year. He has also made a short feature film, 'Vigilance' (1997) for TintoFilms. In 2014/15 he directed and presented 'The Travels of a Gadjo in Romanistan', seven 52 minute documentaries Spot Productions, Budapest, on Roma communities in 9 European countries. The films were first shown from March to July 2015 on Duna TV. In 2020 he presented a documentary series of 8, 45 minute films called “The Danube – Against the Flow” For AMC and Spektrum TV. It has been broadcast in Hungary, Sweden, Greece, Israel and South Korea.

== Publications ==
In 2009, Thorpe wrote his first book, entitled '89: The Unfinished Revolution – Power and Powerlessness in Eastern Europe, published by Reportage Press. In 2016 it was republished in a digital edition by Endeavour Press, London.

In January 2014 he published his second book, entitled The Danube – A Journey Upriver from the Black Sea to the Black Forest, Yale University Press, New Haven and London, 2014. This has been translated so far into 3 languages: in Polish as 'Dunaj' (Jagiellonian University Press, Kraków, 2014) in Hungarian as 'Duna' (Scolar Kiadó, Budapest, 2016), and in German as: Die Donau – Eine Reise gegen den Strom, Zsolnay 2017, ISBN 978-3-552-05861-3 It is due to come out in Hebrew and Italian in 2018.

In May 2019 he published his third book, 'The Road Before Me Weeps – On the refugee route through Europe', Yale University Press. This appeared in German in 2020, as 'Die weinende Strasse vor mir', translated by Carsten Schmidt, publisher Danube Books Verlag: danube books, Ulm, Germany. He has also contributed to numerous other books and publications, including: 'A Jar of Wild Flowers – Essays in Celebration of John Berger' (Zed Books, London, 2016), 'From Our Own Correspondent – A Celebration of 50 Years of the BBC Radio Programme' (Profile Books, London, 2005), 'More From Our Own Correspondent' (Profile Books, London, 2008), and the New York Review of Books 'On the Refugee Road' (with Malise Ruthven) 2016.

In February 2025 Walking Europe's Last Wilderness: A Journey through the Carpathian Mountains was published by Yale University Press.
