= Alistair Bunkall =

British journalist

- Born: Alistair Edward Julian Bunkall; February 22nd 1982 (age 44); Bristol
- Education: Sherborne School; University of Bristol; City University
- Occupations: Journalist and TV news correspondent
- Employer: Sky News
- Notable work: Off the Record with Alistair Bunkall (podcast)
- Title: Europe Correspondent of Sky News (2026–present); Middle East Correspondent of Sky News (2021–2026)

Alistair Edward Julian Bunkall (born 1982, Bristol), is an Emmy Award winning and multi-BAFTA nominated British journalist, currently working as Europe correspondent for Sky News, the 24-hour television news service operated by Sky UK. Alistair was previously a Middle East correspondent, defence and security correspondent for seven years and reported from many conflicts around the world including Afghanistan, Yemen and the Islamic State insurgency in Iraq.

== Early life and education ==
Bunkall was born in Bristol in February 1982, and grew up in the village of Buckland Newton in north Dorset in South West England.

Bunkall was educated at Sherborne School, a boarding independent school for boys, in the market town of Sherborne in Dorset in South West England, followed by the University of Bristol in the city of Bristol, also in South West England. He took a postgraduate degree at the City University in Central London, in 2004.

== Early career ==
Bunkall is an experienced foreign correspondent, having reported from more than 30 countries during his career with Sky News, including the conflicts in Ukraine, Syria, Iraq, Yemen, Afghanistan, Gaza and West Bank.

He is also one of few Western journalists to have reported from North Korea

After leaving Sherborne School, Bunkall gained work experience at the Dorset Echo, a local daily newspaper. While still at the University of Bristol, he worked for BBC Radio Bristol and BBC Somerset Sound. After completing his postgraduate degree at City University in London in 2004, he joined BBC News, and reported for the BBC One O'Clock News. He went on to work in two ITV regions, initially as a sports correspondent: ITV Central and ITV Thames Valley, and for the CKNW radio station in the city of Vancouver in British Columbia, on the West Coast of Canada.

== Sky News ==
Bunkall joined Sky News as a general news reporter in 2007. He has held various positions at the channel including as business correspondent, political correspondent, and defence and security correspondent. He is currently the channel's Middle East correspondent.

He has reported from Sudan in the run-up to the crucial elections leading up to independence, and on the Norwegian twin terror attacks in early 2011.

Bunkall also reported from Denmark after the attempted assassination of a Danish cartoonist.

In 2014 he was deployed to the Philippines in the aftermath of Typhoon Haiyan to report on the multi-national humanitarian relief effort.

He became Sky News defence correspondent in December 2012 and Middle East correspondent in 2021. He has reported on the conflicts in Afghanistan, Iraq, Yemen, Syria, Ukraine and South Sudan. He has also reported from North Korea and is known for his access into some of the UK's most secretive establishments including the nuclear deterrent, covert drone base and intelligence agencies. Bunkall has interviewed key world figures including prime ministers, NATO secretaries general, leading diplomats and military officers.

Bunkall has reported on elections in Pakistan, Israel, Turkey, the UK, South Sudan and the 2020 US Presidential election.

Since July 2019, Bunkall has run an independent podcast series, titled "Off The Record with Alistair Bunkall", where he interviews "some of the world's great leaders". Recent high-profile interviews include Sir Alex Younger, former head of MI6.

== Personal life ==
Bunkall is married to Kate. They live in the Europe with their two children.
