= Carl Philpott =

British medical researcher

Carl Martin Philpott FRCS (born June 1975) is professor of rhinology and olfactology at the University of East Anglia. He established the United Kingdom's first smell and taste clinic.
