= John Newsom-Davis =

John Newsom-Davis CBE FRS FRCP FMedSci
- Born: 18 October 1932; Harpenden, Hertfordshire, England, United Kingdom
- Died: 24 August 2007 (aged 74); Adjud, Romania
- Citizenship: British
- Education: Pembroke College, Cambridge
- Awards: Queen Square Prize in Neurology; RCP Jean Hunter Prize; Ellison-Cliffe Lecture & Medal; RCP Moxon Medal; ABN Medal
- Scientific career
- Fields: Neurology
- Workplaces: National Hospital; Royal Free Hospital; Cornell Medical Center (1969-70); Oxford University (1987-98)

John Michael Newsom-Davis (18 October 1932 – 24 August 2007) was a neurologist who played an important role in the discovery of the causes of, and treatments for, Myasthenia gravis, and of other diseases of the nerve-muscle junction, notably Lambert–Eaton myasthenic syndrome and acquired neuromyotonia. Regarded as "one of the most distinguished clinical neurologists and medical scientists of his generation," he died in a car accident in Adjud, Romania, having visited a neurological clinic in Bucharest earlier the same day. (Note: "On the day of the accident, Prof Newsom-Davis had visited a neurological clinic in Bucharest where he intended to start a study about early thymectomy in MG patients (according to Dr Ioana Mindruta, the clinician involved in the study).She told me that everybody was so excited about this collaboration, so much hope for us the patients... but once more we were so unlucky, ...we lost a father too... Ioana told me that the professor and his wife just left the clinic and went to a trip to see the ancient painted monasteries in Moldavia ...then was the tragedy. It's awful." (Radulescu 2007))

== Early life and family ==
John Newsom-Davis was born in Harpenden, Hertfordshire, the eldest child and only son of Kenneth Newsom-Davis, the managing director of the Davis Gas Cooker Company, and his wife Eileen, a doctor's daughter. He had a twin sister, Julia. He was educated at Sherborne and Pembroke College, Cambridge. During his two years national service in the RAF (1951–53), he qualified for full pilot training, and learned to fly Meteor jet fighters.

In 1963 he married Rosemary Elizabeth Schmid, an English Swiss, who later became an educational psychologist, working in child development. They had two daughters and a son, and (at the date of his death) seven grandchildren.

== Career ==
Newsom-Davis qualified MB BChir in 1960 at the Middlesex Hospital, and then joined Tom Sears at the National Hospital, Queen Square. After studying the physiology of breathing there, he spent a year at the Cornell Medical Center, New York City, working with Fred Plum on the central pathways involved in breathing. On returning from New York in 1970 he was appointed consultant neurologist jointly at the National and at the Royal Free Hospital. At the latter hospital he built up an active research group, becoming the first MRC Clinical Research Professor in 1980.

In 1987 he was recruited to the Action Research Chair of Clinical Neurology at Oxford University, with a Fellowship at St Edmund Hall, bringing with him most of his research team from the Royal Free. At Oxford not only did he build up clinical neuroscience in his own field of immune-mediated and genetic diseases, he also established a Centre for the Functional Magnetic Resonance Imaging of the Brain, which was recognised as a world leader.

In 1997 he succeeded Ian McDonald as editor of the Neurology Journal Brain, making it one of the first scientific journals to go online.

He was elected a Fellow of the Royal College of Physicians in 1973, a Fellow of the Royal Society in 1991, and awarded a CBE in 1996. In 1997 he received the Ellison-Cliffe Medal from the Royal Society of Medicine. His achievements were recognised internationally in his honorary membership of the American Academy of Neurology and his election as a foreign member of the Institute of Medicine of the United States National Academy of Sciences.

=== Retirement ===
After his "retirement" from Oxford in 1998, he continued to edit Brain until 2004 and to hold a weekly myasthenia clinic, as well as honouring many invitations to lecture abroad. He also took on the huge task, together with the National Institutes of Health in the United States, of organising and funding a multi-centre trial (over 80 centres) to determine whether thymectomy is an appropriate treatment for myasthenia gravis.

== Positions held ==
- Lecturer, University Department of Clinical Neurology, National Hospital for Diseases of the Nervous System (1967–69)
- Consultant Neurologist, National Hospital for Diseases of the Nervous System and Royal Free Hospital (1970–80)
- Neurological Research Fellow, Cornell Medical Center, New York Hospital (1969–70)
- MRC Clinical Research Professor of Neurology, Royal Free Hospital Medical School and Institute of Neurology (1980–87)
- Professor of Clinical Neurology, Oxford University (1987–98)

in professional bodies

- Honorary Secretary of the Association of British Neurologists (1981–84)
- Founder member of the Academy of Medical Sciences
- Chair of the MRC Neurosciences Board (1983–85)
- President of the Biomedical Section of the British Association for the Advancement of Science
- President of the Association of British Neurologists (1999–2000)

other

- editor of the neurology journal Brain (1997–2004)
- President of the Myasthenia Gravis Association

== Sources ==
- "Background and Organisational Structure". FMRIB Centre, University of Oxford. Archived from the original on 16 May 2008.
- Compston, Alastair (August 2004). "Editorial". Brain. 127 (8): 1689–1690. doi:10.1093/brain/awh240. ISSN 1460-2156.
- Godwin-Austen, R (25 March 1999). "Award of ABN Medal". Association of British Neurologists. Archived from the original on 5 February 2007.
- "MGFA Mourns passing of John Newsom-Davis, CBE, FRS". Myasthenia Gravis Foundation of America. Archived from the original on 17 September 2007.
- Radulescu, Nadia (5 September 2007). "Letters of tribute from EuroMyasthenia Partners". Euro Myasthenia. Archived from the original on 26 July 2011.
- Vincent, Angela (18 September 2007). "Professor John Newsom-Davis". Obituary. The Independent. p. 34. Archived from the original on 23 December 2007.
- Vincent, Angela (30 December 2019). "John Newsom-Davis. 18 October 1932 – 24 August 2007". Biographical Memoirs of Fellows of the Royal Society. 67: 327–355. doi:10.1098/rsbm.2019.0028.
- Weatherall, David (21 September 2007). "John Newsom-Davis: Neurologist whose work had wide implications in biology and medicine". Obituary. The Guardian.
