= Sherborne School =

Public school in Sherborne, Dorset, England

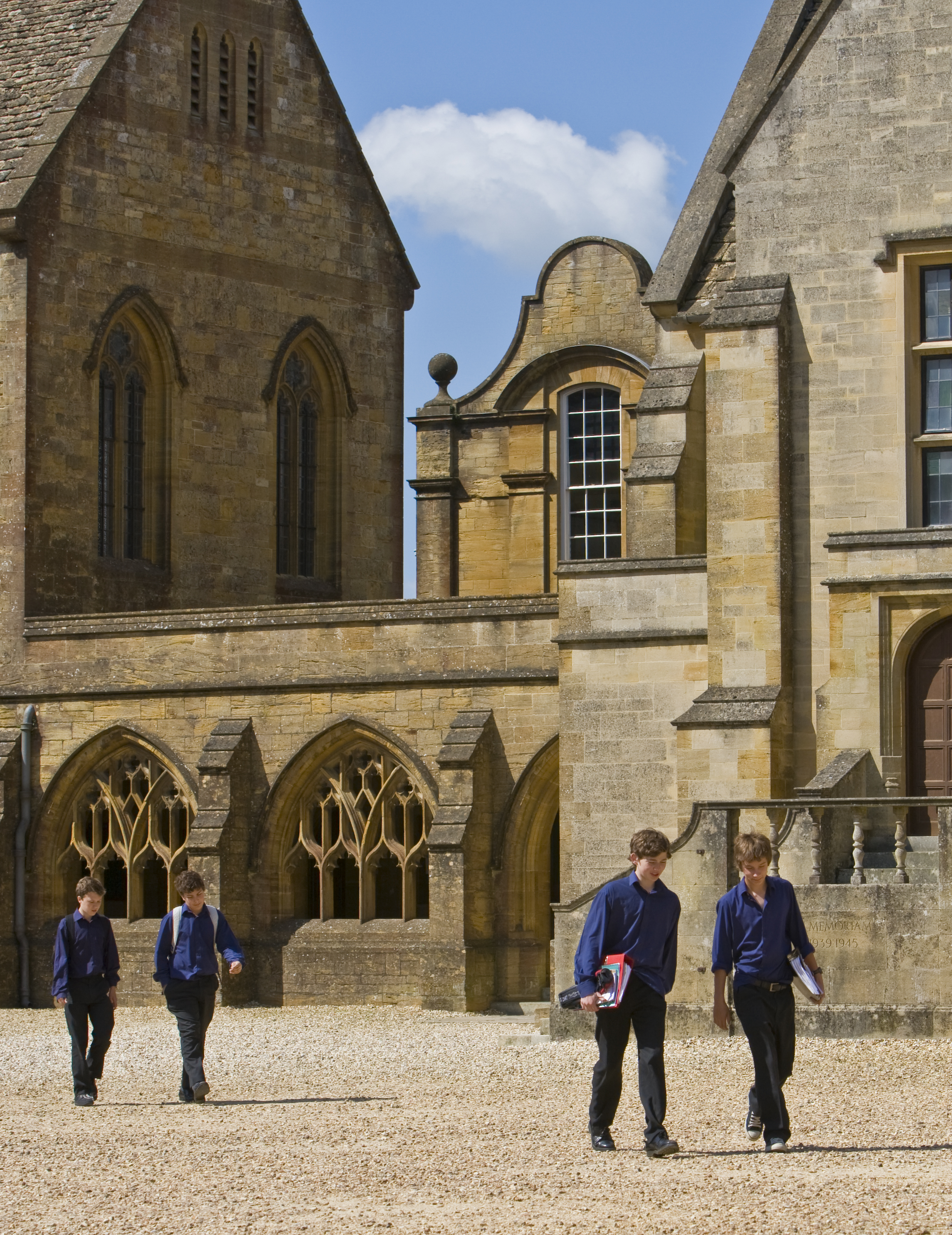
- School seals Shirburnians in Blues walking across the Courts to classes

Location
- Abbey Road; Sherborne, Dorset, DT9 3AP; United Kingdom; 50.9478°N 2.5145°W

Information
- Type: 13–18 boys Public school Private, boarding school
- Motto: French: Dieu et Mon Droit (God and My Right)
- Religious affiliation: Church of England
- Established: 705 by Aldhelm, re-founded by Edward VI 1550
- Founder: St Aldhelm
- Department for Education URN: 113918 Tables
- Chair: Christopher Samler
- Headmaster: Simon Heard
- Staff: 165
- Gender: Boys
- Age: 13 to 18
- Enrolment: 540
- Student to teacher ratio: 14:1
- Houses: 7 from September 2026
- Colour
- Song: Carmen Saeculare
- Publication: The Shirburnian
- Alumni: Old Shirburnians
- Website: http://www.sherborneboys.group

Sherborne School is a full boarding school with exceptions for a few day pupils, for boys aged 13 to 18 located beside Sherborne Abbey in the Dorset town of Sherborne. The School has been in continuous operation on the same site for over 1,300 years. It was founded in AD 705 by St Aldhelm and, following the dissolution of the monasteries, re-founded in 1550 by Edward VI, making it one of the oldest schools in the United Kingdom. Sherborne is one of the twelve founding member public schools of the Headmasters' and Headmistresses' Conference in 1869 and is a member of the Eton Group and Boarding Schools Association.

Sherborne educates about 540 boys, aged 13 to 18, and three quarters of its 2021 A level results were A or A* grades. Many of the school buildings are on the National Heritage List for England, including seven listed as grade I, four listed as grade II*, and 19 listed as grade II; the Courts' south side is a scheduled monument.

The school also has a branch located in Doha, Qatar, which was built following the Emir of Qatar, Tamim bin Hamad Al Thani's, time at the school, as well as in Jeddah and Riyadh, Saudi Arabia.

== History ==
=== 705–1539 ===
Sherborne was founded as a cathedral when, in 705 AD, King Ine of Wessex instructed Aldhelm, a churchman and distinguished scholar, to found a cathedral and college of clergy at Sherborne to relieve pressure from the growing see of Winchester. It is one of the oldest schools in the United Kingdom.

Anglo-Saxon masonry survives in the Beckett Room, below the chool library, a reminder that Sherborne continues to occupy part of the Saxon Cathedral to which it owes its foundation. Alfred the Great, King of the Anglo-Saxons, is said to have been an early pupil of the school, a tradition supported by the seat of West Saxon government having moved to Sherborne in 860 (after Winchester was sacked by the Danes) when Alfred was about 11 years old. That Alfred's son, later Bishop of Sherborne, was also educated at a cathedral school (in Winchester following its recovery by Wessex) is regarded as additional presumptive evidence in support of the claim. Aldhelm was the first Bishop of Sherborne, and the school remained under the direction of Sherborne's bishops until 1122, when its supervision passed to the abbot of the Benedictine monastery which had been established at Sherborne by Wulfsige III in 998. The school continued under monastic direction until the dissolution of the monasteries by Henry VIII in 1539.

The school continues to occupy the site of the former monastery; the school chapel (12th century, modified in the 15th, 19th, and 20th centuries), library (13th century, 15th-century roof and windows), and the Abbot's House (c. 1480), occupied by the headmaster and the senior staff, are all former monastic buildings. The outlines of the monastic cloister, and curious first-floor Abbot's Chapel, are visible on the walls beyond the Abbot's House.

=== 1539–1550 ===
While the dissolution of the Benedictine Monastery of Sherborne in 1539 had an impact on administration and finances, Sherborne School remained in continuous operation, as evidenced by extant documents including the abbey churchwardens' accounts for 1542, which record a rent received from the School, and conclusively from a note on the certificate for Dorset under the Chantries Act, dated 14 January 1548, which records the School at Sherborne as continuatur quousque [long continued].

=== 1550–present ===
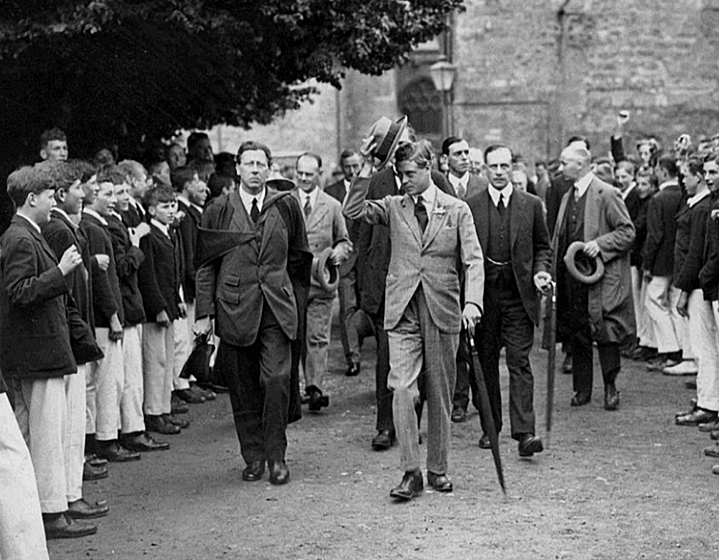
Edward, Prince of Wales, later Edward VIII, visiting Sherborne School on 19 July 1923

On 29 March 1550 a formal instruction was issued by Edward VI to re-found Sherborne School – the first of his whole foundation – together with a good endowment of lands that the School might ever endure. A beautifully engrossed royal charter was sealed on 13 May 1550, under which the School was to have a headmaster and usher for the education of boys, and a board of twenty governors under a warden. A further note of continuity was struck when the last headmaster of Sherborne under the old foundation, William Gibson, was appointed as the first headmaster under the new foundation.

When Edward VI re-founded Sherborne, he granted the School an endowment of valuable lands which belonged to abolished chantries in the churches of Martock, Gillingham, Lytchett Matravers, Ilminster and the Free Chapel of Thornton in the parish of Marnhull. The lands with which the chantries were endowed are predominantly in Dorset, specifically in the manors of:

- Wimborne
- Silton
- Milton
- Combermeade
- Lytchett Matravers
- Sturminster Marshall
- Symondsbury

On 24 October 1851 Edward Digby, 2nd Earl Digby, owner of nearby Sherborne Castle, gave to the governors of the School a plot of land, measuring just under 1 1/2 acres (0.6 hectares), including the remaining old monastic buildings, though these had been converted for use as a silk mill c1740. This more than doubled the size of the school site and contributed hugely to the school's development thereafter. The old monastic buildings were restored and converted into a chapel, dormitories, big schoolroom, and classrooms in 1853, and over time the quadrangle, as can be seen today, was gradually formed.

In 1873, the governors bought a further 8 acres (3 hectares) or so from Lord Digby's trustees, allowing the creation of additional facilities and further prospects for the School. The old Abbey Silk Mill (not to be confused with the silk mill in the old monastic buildings) was converted into a workshop, concert room, museum, armoury, and laboratories, and a swimming bath was dug nearby, followed by the building of the fives courts the following year. The sanatorium in was completed in 1887, and the next big construction project was the Carrington Building in 1910, incorporating and replacing (in part) the old Abbey Silk Mill, to be used as new laboratories and classrooms. A new workshop was completed ten years later, forming what is now the Devitt Court. Over the years many more construction projects were completed, including the sports centre in 1974 (redeveloped in 2023), the largest most recently being the Music School in 2010.

On 1 June 1950 King George VI and Queen Elizabeth visited Sherborne School and took part in the celebrations marking the four hundredth anniversary of the granting of Sherborne's royal charter.

Established in 1977, Sherborne International is an independent co-educational boarding school, owned and governed by Sherborne School, for those from non-British educational backgrounds who wish to improve their English language skills before moving on to study at boarding schools elsewhere in the United Kingdom. It is located in Sherborne, occupying its own campus, Newell Grange, while sharing some facilities with Sherborne School. In 2009 Sherborne founded Sherborne Qatar Prep School in Doha, Qatar, followed by Sherborne Qatar Senior School in 2012.

In 2005, 50 of the country's leading independent schools, including Sherborne, were found guilty of running an illegal price-fixing cartel, which had allowed them to drive up tuition fees. Each school was required to pay a nominal penalty of £10,000. All schools involved in the scandal agreed to make ex-gratia payments totalling £3 million into a trust. The trust was designed to benefit pupils who attended the schools during the period in respect of which fee information was shared. However, Jean Scott, the head of the Independent Schools Council, said that independent schools had always been exempt from anti-cartel rules applied to business, and were following a long-established procedure in sharing information with each other, and were unaware of the change to the law (on which they had not been consulted). She wrote to John Vickers, the OFT director-general, saying, "They are not a group of businessmen meeting behind closed doors to fix the price of their products to the disadvantage of the consumer. They are schools that have quite openly continued to follow a long-established practice because they were unaware that the law had changed."

Sherborne School merged with Sherborne Prep School in April 2021. Sherborne Prep School is a co-educational independent preparatory school for boys and girls aged 3–13 years, affiliated to the Independent Association of Prep School (IAPS). Sherborne has a partnership with the neighbouring Sherborne Girls school. While both are single-sex boarding schools, a programme of shared academic, co-curricular and social activities enables boys and girls to mix and work together.

=== Former boarding houses ===
House	Letter	Dates	House Colours		
Ramsam House	–	1855–60, 1868–90			Blue and Black
Abbey Cottage	–	1858–72	–	–	–
Westbury House	–	1861–68, 1872–85	–	–	–
9&11 Cheap Street	–	1864–68	–	–	–
Mapperty House	g	1885–90			White and Black
Westcott House	h	1920-1999			White and Black
Wallace House	e	1931-2026			Red and navy

From 1899 to 1902, Ramsam House, renamed as Wingfield House, was the first home of Sherborne Girls' School before moving to their current site. Abbey Cottage, now the bursary, was the first location of Sherborne Preparatory School, though it was used to board a few Sherborne School boy as well. It relocated to Westbury House, now Wessex House, in 1872, and finally to its current site in 1885, when the Preparatory School became independent.

Westbury House, formerly the Bell Inn, was used solely for Sherborne School boys from 1861 to 1868, it was then used again to house Sherborne Preparatory School, as well as the boarders from Abbey Cottage, 1872–85. It is possible that the Sherborne School boys from Westbury House were then relocated again to Mapperty House, though this is only speculative as the dates match up – it could merely be a coincidence. 9&11 Cheap Street (there doesn't seem to have been a name for this building at the time) was used to board a number of boys between 1864 and 1868. Curiously, the housemaster did not live within the building, but some 200 yards away at Monk's Barn. This is "an illuminating revelation of the accepted conditions in Victorian days".

In 1999, Westcott House was taken over by Sherborne International due to falling numbers. When Sherborne International closed in 2019, Westcott House came back into the possession of Sherborne School. It was planned to reopen as the in September 2021, but this was delayed due to the COVID-19 pandemic.

Wallace House (formerly Elmdene) was originally used as a 'waiting house', but in 1977 it became a full house and was renamed Wallace House after headmaster Alexander Ross Wallace. In March 2026 it was announced Wallace House would be closing at the end of the academic year due to the increased operating costs caused by the imposition of 20% VAT on independent schools.

== Overview ==
=== Boarding school ===
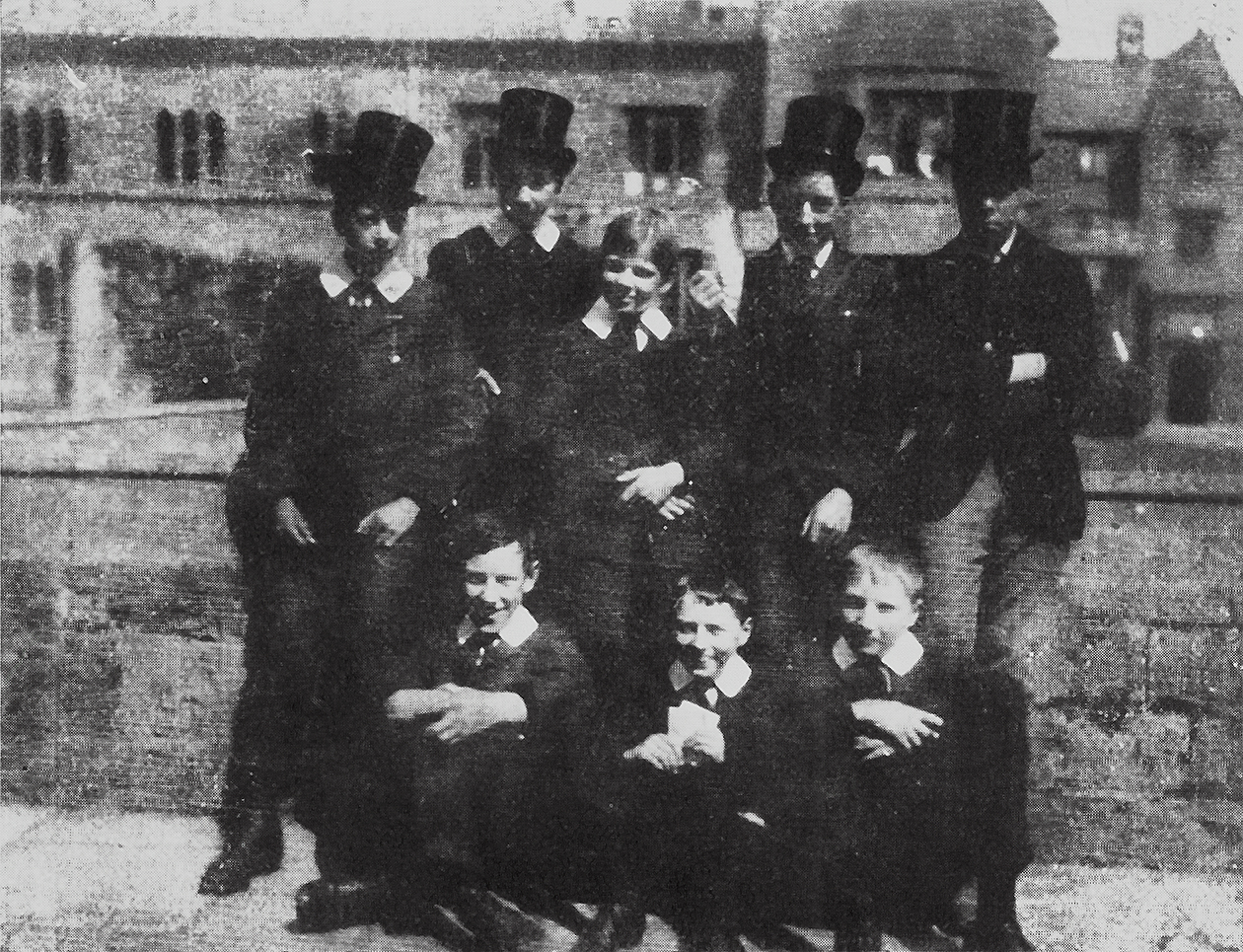
Pupils at Sherborne School in 1907

In the English public school tradition, Sherborne remains a full boarding school with boys living seven days a week in one of seven boarding houses. Sherborne is one of four such remaining single-sex boys' boarding independent senior schools in the United Kingdom (the remaining others being Eton, Harrow and Radley).

=== School terms ===
There are three academic terms in the Sherborne year,

- The Michaelmas Term, from early September to mid December. New boys are admitted at the start of the Michaelmas Term.
- The Lent Term, from mid-January to late March.
- The Trinity Term, from late April to late June/early July.

=== Houses ===
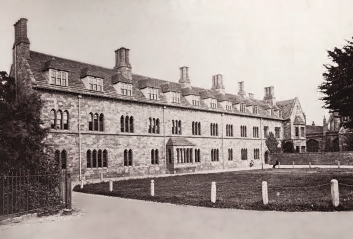
School House, whose cornerstone was laid on 26 June 1860 by the Earl of Shaftesbury, has been in continuous use as a boarding house to this day.

Sherborne is a full boarding school for boys with boarding houses operating on the house system. In addition to a house master, each house has a matron, assistant matron, senior tutor and one or more resident tutors. Each house has around 70 boys from across all year groups.

There are seven boarding houses:

House	Distinctive letter	Date founded	House Colours
School House	a	1860	Magenta and black
Abbey House	b	1868	Purple and black
The Green	c	1865	Yellow and black
Harper House	d	1873	Light blue and black
Abbeylands	f	1872	Red and black
Lyon House	g	1912	Dark blue and black
The Digby	m	1964	Green and black

Abbey House has been in continuous use since 1868, but it was also used from 1835 to 1849.

In 1999, The Green moved from the Old Green (formerly the Angel Inn) to its current site at Greenhill House (formerly the site of Sherborne International, until 1991). The Old Green was then converted into housing.

Sherborne School houses are separated into in and out houses, with in houses situated near to the school, and out houses spread out around the town. In: a, b, c, f. Out: d, g, m.

== School features ==
=== Chapel and library ===
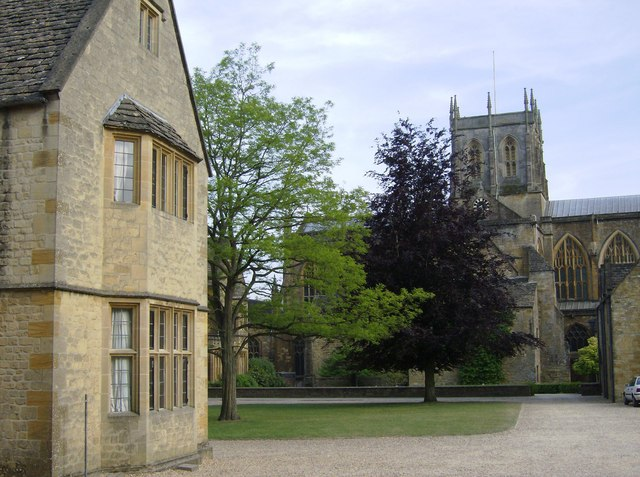
View of the Abbey from Sherborne School Courts

The school chapel was originally the monastic hall (built in the early 15th century over the 12th century undercroft) used by the Abbot of Sherborne Abbey. It was in use as a silk mill from c. 1740 and was acquired by the school in 1851 from Lord Digby. It was restored and extended, and in 1855, consecrated as a chapel, dedicated to St John the Evangelist. It has been extended several times: eastwards in 1853; westwards in 1865; northwards, to create the north aisle, in 1878 and; eastwards in 1881 (into the headmaster's building); westwards and northwards in 1922 to extend the nave, and create the antechapel which has the names engraved of those who died in World War I and World War II. The Side Chapel, created by knocking through into the School House Studies (now the headmaster's building) in 1881, was dedicated to St Andrew in 1988 and has its own altar.

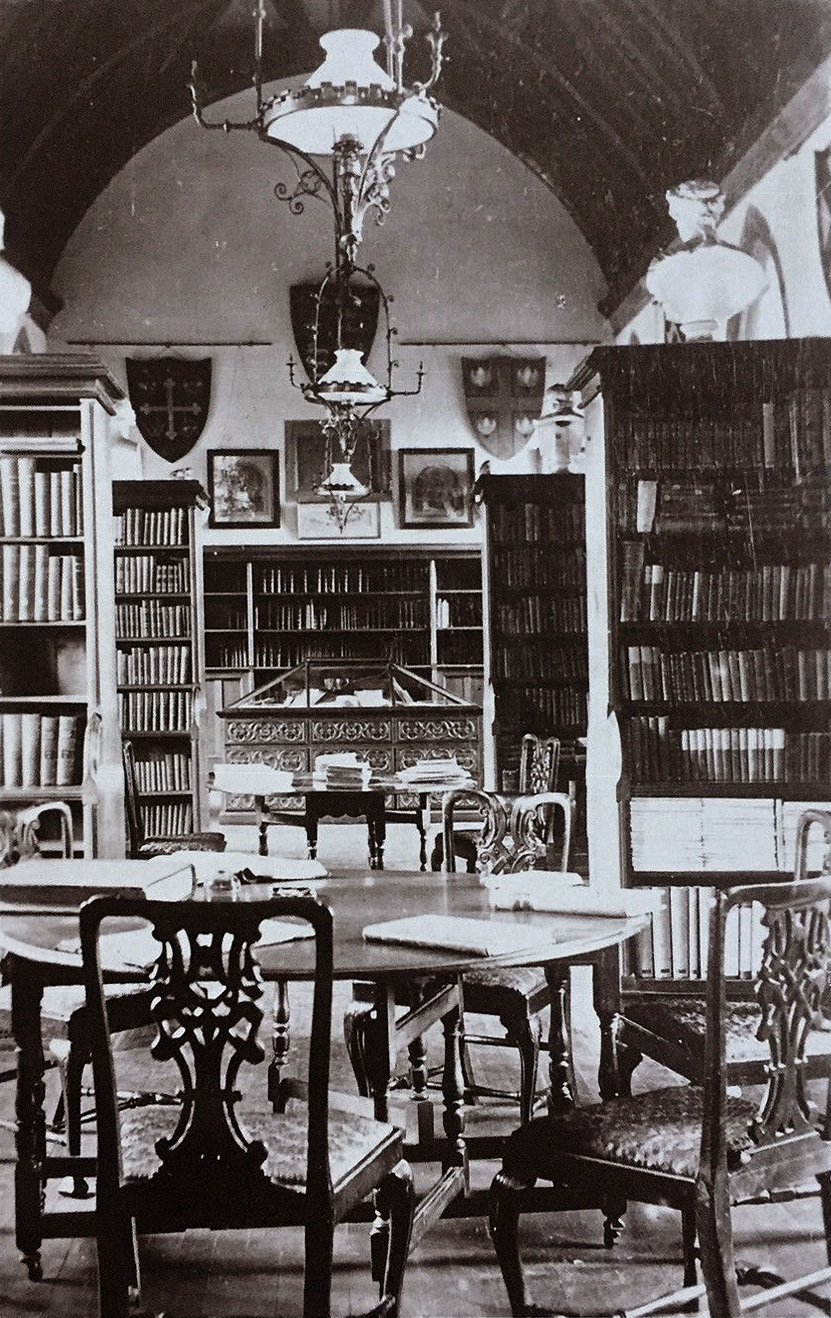
Sherborne Library north end

The library was the "Abbot's Guesten Hall" (13th century, modified 15th century) and would have looked over the Garth and conduit before the latter was moved to the town's market place in 1553. The building was a silk mill from c. 1740 and later still, perhaps, a brewery. It was acquired by the School in 1851 and restored in 1853. The Upper Library was used as the main school assembly room up until 1879 (when the Big Schoolroom was built) and has been used as the main school library since. The Lower Library was the cellarer's store room and outer parlour. Later it was used as three classrooms, then the headmaster's office, but since 1926 it has been used as the Lower Library. In 1981 the library expanded into the 12th century undercroft below the chapel. From 1670 to 1861, the school library was situated in the current School House Oak Room (built 1607), before being moved to its current location.

=== Old Schoolroom and The Slype ===
The Old Schoolroom (OSR) is the oldest of the buildings specifically designed for school use and was the original "scholehouse" built in 1554, on the site of an earlier "schole". The building as seen today dates from when it was rebuilt in 1606 with the architect believed to have been Inigo Jones (1573–1652). High on the east wall is an effigy of Edward VI, sculpted by Godfrey Arnold in 1614. A bay window was added to the South wall in 1886 when the building was undergoing another restoration. The windowsills of the OSR are made out of old school desks and are covered, on both upper and under faces, with historic graffiti of boys' names, the earliest known being from 1698.

A "New Schoolhouse with Offices" was built to the north in 1607, providing space for a writing school with a library above (the latter is now the School House Oak Room). To the north was a brewhouse and woodhouse, built at the same time, extended in 1642, and cellars made in 1655. Only the cellar and 1642 extension survive today as in 1835 they were demolished to make space for a new classroom with dormitories (since known as the Bell Buildings) on top of the 17th-century cellar. The Old Schoolroom was used for the town's assizes from 1604 for around 85 years, and from 1645 to 1649 it was occupied by a garrison from the Civil War.

The Slype is a lean-to building against the north transept of the abbey and is the only surviving part of what would have been the monks' dormitory. On the lower floor, there is a passage with 12th-century arcading, as well as two 13th-century vaulted chambers. The passage would have led from the cloisters towards the monk's infirmary. It was probably used in part as a mortuary before monks were buried, and a number of skeletons have been found on the site. It was brought into the school's use in 1550, as part of the Royal charter, and has since been used as a brewery, laundry, vegetable store, lumber shed, boot room, and ravens' nook.

=== Bow House and Abbey Grange ===
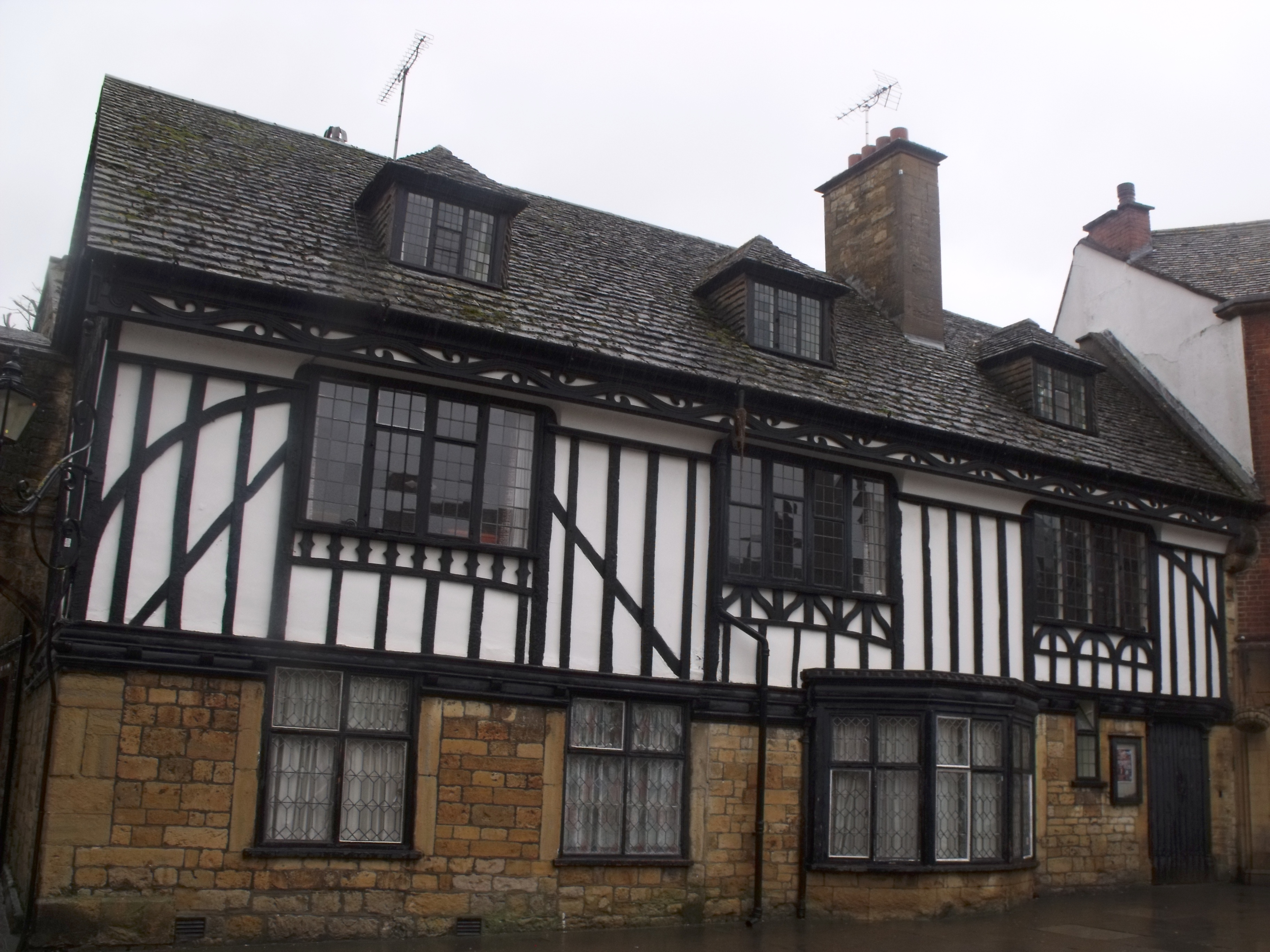
Bow House has been owned by the school since 1916, and the Senior Common Room since 1921

Bow House is thought to date from the 14th century, but probably rebuilt in the 16th or 17th century. It became an inn c1850 and in 1916 the school bought the building as a staff common room, which it remains as today.

Built in the 14th or 15th century, the Abbey Grange was originally the monastic granary. In 1827 it was converted into a dwelling by an OS governor, and in 1969 the governors bought the property to house the headmaster and their family.

=== St Emerenciana's Chapel and Abbeylands ===
Now known as Nethercombe Farm, this building is in the grounds of Sherborne International. It dates from the late 14th century and was originally a hall-house with attached barn. It is the only religious building in the country to have been dedicated to this saint.

The oldest part of Abbeylands, fronting onto Cheap Street, dates from the 16th century. It was extended in 1649 and again in 1872. It is said that there is an underground passage that runs from the cellars at Abbeylands to Sherborne Abbey, but this has never been substantiated.

=== The Shell House ===
Within the garden of Harper House is a very rare and early example of a classically inspired shell house. It dates from c. 1750 though it likely originated as a C17 dovecote. All of the shells are native to the British Isles, with the majority coming from the Dorset coast. There is a small ice room beneath.

== Subjects ==
=== Music ===
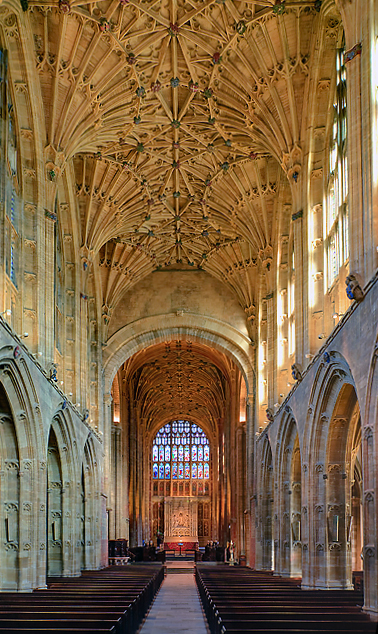
Sherborne School Choir sings in twice weekly services attended by the whole school in the Abbey.

Music is a Sherborne tradition. Many boys achieve grade 8 distinctions for voice and a range of instruments. Several boys each year also pass their ATCL diplomas, many with distinction. Some then go on to take their LTCL diplomas. The Week Good Schools Guide named Sherborne as The Best Independent School in the Country for Music in 2015.

In 2010 Sherborne built a new music school with highly specialist recital and recording space. Designed by Richard Keating of Orms, the building won numerous architectural awards including the 2012 RIBA South West Region Award, BCSE Award 2012 and RIBA South West Excellence in Architecture Award 2012. The school has two choirs, two close harmony groups, a symphony orchestra, sinfonia, chamber orchestra, concert and radio orchestras (Trinity term only), wind band, wind quintet, string, wind, brass and jazz ensembles and various other smaller instrumental ensembles. Performance spaces include the Tindall Recital Hall, the Big Schoolroom, and the Powell Theatre. There are two Abbey services a week which are accompanied by the chapel choir, with the chamber choir singing an introit on Sundays. Once a term the chamber choir sings for a service in an external venue. These include: Salisbury Cathedral, Winchester Cathedral and various Oxford college chapels, amongst numerous others, as well as these, international tours are available for various ensembles.

The Sherborne School Choral Society was founded in 1871 by J R Sterndale-Bennett, the then director of music. Nowadays it consists of the Sherborne School choirs, Girls' School Choir, and members of public from the local area. It performs annually, and concert venues have included Sherborne Abbey, Wells Cathedral, and Poole Lighthouse. The school song is the Carmen Saeculare, also known as Carmen Shirburniense, and features a rousing last line in each verse of Vivat Rex Eduardus Sextus or Long Live King Edward the Sixth to commemorate the school's Royal foundation in 1550. The words were written by Edward Mallet Young in 1887, and set to music by Louis Napoleon Parker. It is sung by the entire school, including the staff, although only the first and last verses are sung nowadays. Sherborne holds its own rock festival in the heart of its historic grounds, aptly named "Concert in the Courts", featuring Shirburnians and boys and girls from local senior schools, performing and spectating. The festival began in the mid 1990s and the proceeds from it are donated to charity.

In the chapel there are two organs: one is a 24-stop Neo-Baroque pipe organ by S.F. Blank; the other is a Hauptwerk virtual organ with the specification of the Hereford Cathedral organ. This organ was installed by Magnus and is the largest instrument they have installed in the UK.

=== Sport ===
The school's cricket ground – the Upper – is usually used by the 1st XI cricket team. The ground was first used in 1870, when Sherborne School played Clifton College. The ground is also one of the venues used by Dorset for their home fixtures. Dorset played their first match on the ground in the 1902 Minor Counties Championship against Devon. From 1902 to 1997, the ground played host to 69 Minor Counties Championship matches, with the final Championship match involving Dorset coming in 1997 when they played Herefordshire. In addition, the ground has hosted 13 MCCA Knockout Trophy matches, the last of which was in 2008, when Dorset played Buckinghamshire.

The ground has also played host to a single List A match, when Dorset played Bedfordshire in the 1968 Gillette Cup. On 30 May 2010, Dorset played Somerset, which included international players such as Craig Kieswetter in a friendly Twenty20 fixture on the ground. On 27 May 2011, the Upper hosted Dorset against Gloucestershire.

=== Rugby ===
Rugby has been played at Sherborne since 1846. Sherborne was the third school to take up the sport after Rugby itself and Cheltenham, and it competes in an invitational tournament, the Veterrimi IV, involving the four oldest rugby-playing schools. The school has played over 100 matches against local rivals Downside, and the Pilgrims (Old Shirburnians) played their 100th match against Radley in 2015. Robert Hands, a former sports journalist for The Times, has written a history of rugby at Sherborne School.

A number of Old Shirburnians and staff have reached the international stage, including Mike Davis who was a teacher and coach at Sherborne School (1974–2002) where, alongside Phil Jones between 1975 and 1978, he coached the school to four unbeaten seasons with 35 out of 35 school matches being won. Only a handful of games were lost during a coaching partnership which spanned six seasons. He was appointed as head coach of England for the 1979/83 seasons, the only England senior coach ever appointed on the merits of their achievements as a school coach rather than a club coach. In his first season as the England coach, they won the Grand Slam in the 1980 Five Nations Championship, their first championship clean sweep since 1957.

=== Other sports ===
Sherborne also compete in various other sports, these sports include;

==== Clay Shooting ====
Clay shooting has been run at Sherborne for many years, they train at Mendip shooting ground in early 2026, the boys secured 5th out of 30+ teams at the inter schools challenge at Purdey at the Royal Berkshire shooting grounds, along with 4th out of 33 teams at the national Fido May cup, hosted by Harrow School at E.J. Churchill. The Sherborne Clay Shooting teams are renowned for their uniform, at most of the competitions they will be seen in nothing other than a tweed suit with a few exceptions for the younger years who may be in a standard school suit.

==== Swimming ====
Sherborne School maintains a year‑round swimming program for boys. The school fields teams in regular inter‑school galas against other independent schools in the South and West of England, including Marlborough College and Eton College.

== School culture ==
=== School magazine ===
The Shirburnian is the official School magazine, first published in March 1859. It was devised as 'an outlet for its [the school's] wit, and also an easy means of printing all its News, both as regards those of us who are here and those who have left.' The initial run was short-lived, but it was resurrected in May 1864 and has been published continually – almost every term since that year, becoming an annual publication from 1997.

=== In popular culture ===
Sherborne School's buildings and grounds have been used in several films including:

- The Guinea Pig (1948)
- The Browning Version (1951)
- Goodbye Mr Chips (1969)
- A Murder of Quality (1991)
- The Browning Version (1994)
- The Imitation Game (2014)
- Wolf Hall (BBC TV Series 2015)
- Far from the Madding Crowd (2015)

== Historical figures ==
=== Headmasters ===
Headmasters of Sherborne from 1437 to the present time.

- 1437– Thomas Copeland
- 1537–1544 Richard Percy
- 1549– William Gybson
- 1554– Thomas Coke
- 1560–1561 Francis Myddelton
- 1562–1563 Thomas Parvys
- 1564–1565 William Wolverton
- 1565 John Delabere
- 1566–1573 John Hancock
- 1573–1581 Thomas Seward
- 1581–1601 William Wood
- 1601–1603 John Geare
- 1603–1639 George Grove
- 1639–1641 Richard Newman
- 1641–1653 Robert Balch
- 1654–1663 William Birstall
- 1663–1670 Joseph Allen
- 1670–1683 Joseph Goodenough MB
- 1683–1694 Thomas Curgenven
- 1694–1695 Thomas Creech.
- 1695–1720 George Gerrard
- 1720–1733 Benjamin Wilding
- 1733–1743 John Gaylard
- 1743–1751 Thomas Paget
- 1751–1766 Joseph Hill
- 1766–1790 Nathaniel Bristed
- 1790–1823 John Cutler
- 1823–1845 Ralph Lyon
- 1845–1849 Charles Penrose
- 1850–1877 Hugo Daniel Harper
- 1877–1892 Edward Mallet Young
- 1892–1909 Frederick Brooke Westcott
- 1909 Charles Henry Thursfield Wood
- 1909 Frederick Brooke Westcott (acting headmaster)
- 1909–1927 Charles Nowell Smith
- 1928–1933 Charles Lovell Fletcher Boughey
- 1933–1934 William James Bensly (acting headmaster)
- 1934–1950 Alexander Wallace
- 1949 Geoffrey O'Hanlon (acting headmaster)
- 1950–1970 Robert William Powell
- 1970–1974 David Emms
- 1974 Peter Thomas Currie (acting headmaster)
- 1974–1988 Robin Donnelly Macnaghten
- 1988–2000 Peter Herbert Lapping
- 2000–2010 Simon Flowerdew Eliot
- 2010–2014 Christopher Davis
- 2014–2015 Ralph Barlow (acting headmaster)
- 2016–2025 Dominic Luckett
- 2025 Matthew Jamieson (acting headmaster)
- 2025–Present Simon Heard

=== Ushers ===
The usher, or lower master, was appointed by the governors of Sherborne independent of the headmaster. The qualifications required were similar to those for a headmaster, although he was usually a younger man who might reasonably expect to obtain a headmastership elsewhere in time. He was required to have attained at least a BA from Oxford or Cambridge, and he may have been in Holy Orders.

The usher was responsible for teaching the lower three forms and had responsibilities over the boys similar to the modern position of a house tutor. From the fragment of an account roll, still extant, dating from 1549, there is evidence that there was an usher before the re-founding of Sherborne in 1550, but unfortunately the name is not given. The office was abolished in 1871, although the title was later briefly revived to denote the senior deputy head.

- 1560 Henry Bagwell
- 1561 John Martin
- 1563 Thomas Penye
- 1565 George Holman
- 1569 Nicholas Buckler
- 1570 Hammet Hyde
- 1572 Walter Bloboll
- 1573 John Elford
- 1574–1581 no name given
- 1581 [first name not given] Wornell
- 1581 Philip Morris
- 1584 Lawrence Fuller
- 1589 John Rooke
- 1595 William More
- 1605 George Gardiner
- 1611 George Harrison
- 1625 Randell Calcott
- 1629 Richard Camplin
- 1629 John Jacob
- 1635 John Mitchell
- 1638 [first name not given] Proctor
- 1638 John Fyler
- 1647 Thomas Martin
- 1664 Jonathan Grey
- 1667 John Walker
- 1667 William Plowman
- 1675 Peter Blanchard
- 1682 Abraham Forrester
- 1695 Robert Forrester
- 1695 John Butt
- 1718 Edward Cosins
- 1723 John Gaylard
- 1728 James Martin
- 1737 James Thomas
- 1760 William Sharpe
- 1766 John Bristed
- 1779 Robert Pargiter
- 1780 William Glasspoole
- 1800 James Knight Moore
- 1801 William Hoblyn Lake
- 1804 Henry Cutler
- 1805 David Williams
- 1813 Thomas James
- 1860–1871 Arthur Mapletoft Curteis
- 2016–17 Ralph Barlow

=== Old Shirburnians ===
Former pupils of Sherborne School are known as Old Shirburnians or OS. The following is a selection of more recent notable Old Shirburnians:

Notable Old Shirburnians in academia include mathematician, cryptanalyst and father of artificial intelligence and the first modern computer Alan Turing; master of Corpus Christi College, Cambridge and vice-chancellor of Cambridge University Michael McCrum; master of Balliol College and vice-chancellor of Oxford University Sir Colin Lucas; vice-chancellor of Durham University and master of Magdalene College, Cambridge Sir Derman Christopherson; literary scholar Sir Malcolm Pasley; historian Hugh Thomas, Baron Thomas of Swynnerton; mathematician and philosopher Alfred North Whitehead; chemist, curator of the Museum of the History of Science, Oxford and director of the Science Museum Sherwood Taylor; provost of Worcester College, and vice-chancellor of the University of Oxford Francis John Lys; historian and master of Peterhouse, Cambridge Harold Temperley; neurologist John Newsom-Davis; prehistorian and archaeologist Richard Atkinson; professor of European Studies at Oxford University and author Timothy Garton Ash.

Notable Old Shirburnians in the military include commander in chief Naval Home Command Admiral Sir Horace Law; Deputy Supreme Allied Commander Europe Admiral Sir James Perowne; Field Marshal Sir Claud Jacob; commander of 6th Airlanding Brigade during the Rhine Crossing Brigadier Hugh Bellamy; World War One flying ace Captain Keith Muspratt; Battle of Britain flying ace Flight Lieutenant Carl Raymond Davis; commander in chief India, Governor of Gibraltar General Sir Charles Monro; Master-General of the Ordnance General Sir Jeremy Blacker; commander in chief Land Command General Sir John Wilsey; commander in chief Land Command and deputy commander of the International Security Assistance Force in Afghanistan General Sir Nicholas Parker; developer of machine gun tactics and Conservative MP Lieutenant Colonel Reginald Applin; CEO of Aegis Defence Services Lieutenant Colonel Timothy Spicer; director general of the European Union Military Staff in the Council of the European Union, Gentleman Usher of the Black Rod Lieutenant General David Leakey; Commandant General Royal Marines Lieutenant General Sir Martin Garrod; Commandant General Royal Marines Lieutenant General Sir Steuart Pringle; commander of Royal Marines in the Falklands War Major General Julian Thompson; overall British commander in the Gulf War Major General Patrick Cordingley; Major-General Commanding the Household Division and General Officer Commanding London District, Major General Sir Iain Mackay-Dick; commander of British Forces in Hong Kong Major General Sir Roy Redgrave; and Deputy Commander Operation Inherent Resolve Major General Rupert Jones (British Army officer).

Notable Old Shirburnians in diplomacy include Sir Alan Campbell; UK High Commissioner to Australia Sir Brian Barder; British High Commissioner in Malaya Sir Donald MacGillivray; colonial administrator Sir Hugh Norman-Walker; UK Permanent Representative to the United Nations Sir John Weston; UK Ambassador to Turkey and Lieutenant Governor of the Isle of Man Sir Timothy Daunt; Ambassador to Thailand, Austria and Brazil Sir Geoffrey Arnold Wallinger; diplomat, philanthropist and explorer Hugh Carless; Governor-General of New Zealand The Right Honourable Charles Bathurst, 1st Viscount Bledisloe; and UK Ambassador to Serbia and Bosnia Edward Ferguson.

Notable Old Shirburnians in intelligence include two former heads of the Secret Intelligence Service (MI6), Sir Christopher Curwen, and Sir David Spedding, and Daniel Gibson Harris, a naval attaché in Sweden who assisted in the sinking of the Battleship Bismarck.

Notable Old Shirburnians in the law include High Court Judge Sir Antony James Cobham Edwards-Stuart, senator of the College of Justice and Principal Commercial Judge in the Court of Session in Scotland Angus Glennie, Lord Glennie, high court judge in colonial India and prolific author Charles Augustus Kincaid, Solicitor General for Scotland and Lord Advocate William Milligan, Lord Milligan, and solicitor and author Sir Dermot Turing. Old Shirburnians in the media include TV journalist and ITV News political editor Tom Bradby, TV journalist and Sky News defence correspondent Alistair Bunkall, journalist Nigel Dempster, TV journalist and BBC News presenter Simon McCoy, BBC producer and creator of panel games including Just a Minute, Many a Slip. and Twenty Questions Ian Messiter, journalist (Times, The Observer), writer (The New France, Germany and the Germans) and broadcaster, John Ardagh, journalist and film critic for The New Yorker magazine Anthony Lane, and TV, radio and print journalist, and BBC News Central Europe Correspondent Nick Thorpe.

Notable Old Shirburnians in politics include Alan Lennox-Boyd, 1st Viscount Boyd of Merton, Charles Beauclerk, Earl of Burford, Education Minister Sir Christopher Chataway, Michael Marsham, 7th Earl of Romney, William Cecil, 2nd Earl of Salisbury, The Right Honourable The Lord Thomas of Swynnerton, Thomas Buchanan, Robert Key, Paul Tyler, Liberal Party politician John Pardoe, Conservative Party politician Denzil Kingston Freeth, Liberal Party politician Sir Cecil Algernon Cochrane, writer, farmer and father of Boris Johnson, Stanley Johnson, Liberal Democrat politician Andrew Duff, and journalist, author and political commentator Peter Oborne.

Notable Old Shirburnians who have been writers and poets include novelist Alec Waugh, elder brother of Evelyn Waugh, their father author, literary critic, and publisher Arthur Waugh, Poet Laureate Cecil Day-Lewis, novelist David Cornwell (a.k.a. John le Carré), Anthony Berkeley Cox, John Cowper Powys, Jon Stock, literary scholar Malcolm Pasley, Robert McCrum, Tim Heald, novelist Roger Norman, journalist, historian and biographer Brian Moynahan, and Warren Chetham-Strode.

Notable Old Shirburnian actors, musicians and directors include Jeremy Irons, Hugh Bonneville, James Purefoy, John Le Mesurier, Charles Collingwood, Ritchie, film, theatre, television and opera director Sir Richard Charles Hastings Eyre, film director Gerald Grove, Jon Pertwee, Charlie Cox, Lance Percival, lead singer of rock band Coldplay Chris Martin and manager of Coldplay Philip Harvey.

Old Shirburnians who have come from overseas include Emir of Qatar Tamim bin Hamad Al Thani (Sherborne International College), king of Swaziland Mswati III (Sherborne International College), and Regent and Crown Prince of Pahang, Malaysia Tengku Hassanal Ibrahim.

Five Old Shirburnians have been awarded the Victoria Cross, to whom a memorial plaque was commissioned, the unveiling of which took place in the School Chapel on 19 September 2004.

- Henry James Raby.
  VC won in the Crimean War, when he was a lieutenant in the Naval Brigade. Raby was the first man to actually receive the medal, with Queen Victoria pinning it onto him in the first investiture.
- Sir Arthur George Hammond
  VC won in the Second Afghan War, when he was a captain in the Bengal Staff Corps, Indian Army
- Charles Edward Hudson
  VC won in the First World War, when he was a temporary lieutenant colonel in the Sherwood Foresters
- Edward Bamford
  VC won in the First World War, when he was a captain in the Royal Marine Light Infantry
- John Hollington Grayburn,
  VC granted posthumously and he was gazetted captain; won in the Second World War, as a lieutenant in the Parachute Regiment

Notable members of staff include Louis Napoleon Parker, composer of the school song.

== See also ==
- List of the oldest schools in the United Kingdom
- Sherborne bone
