= List of Old Shirburnians born in the 8th to 17th centuries =

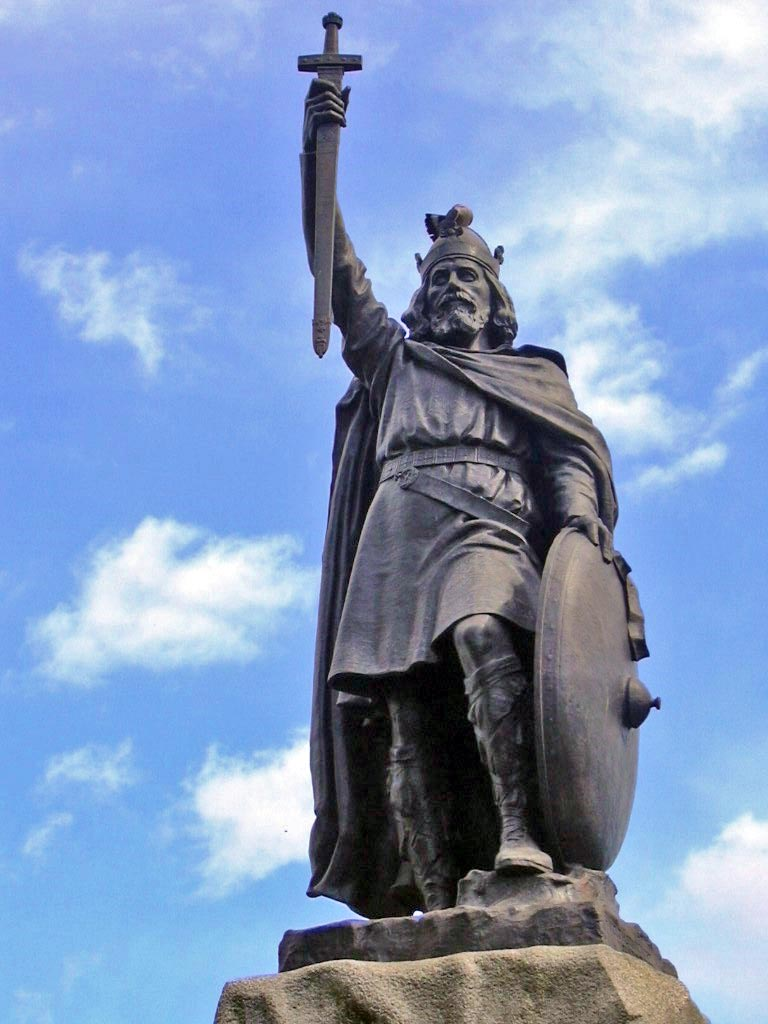
King of the Anglo-Saxons Alfred the Great

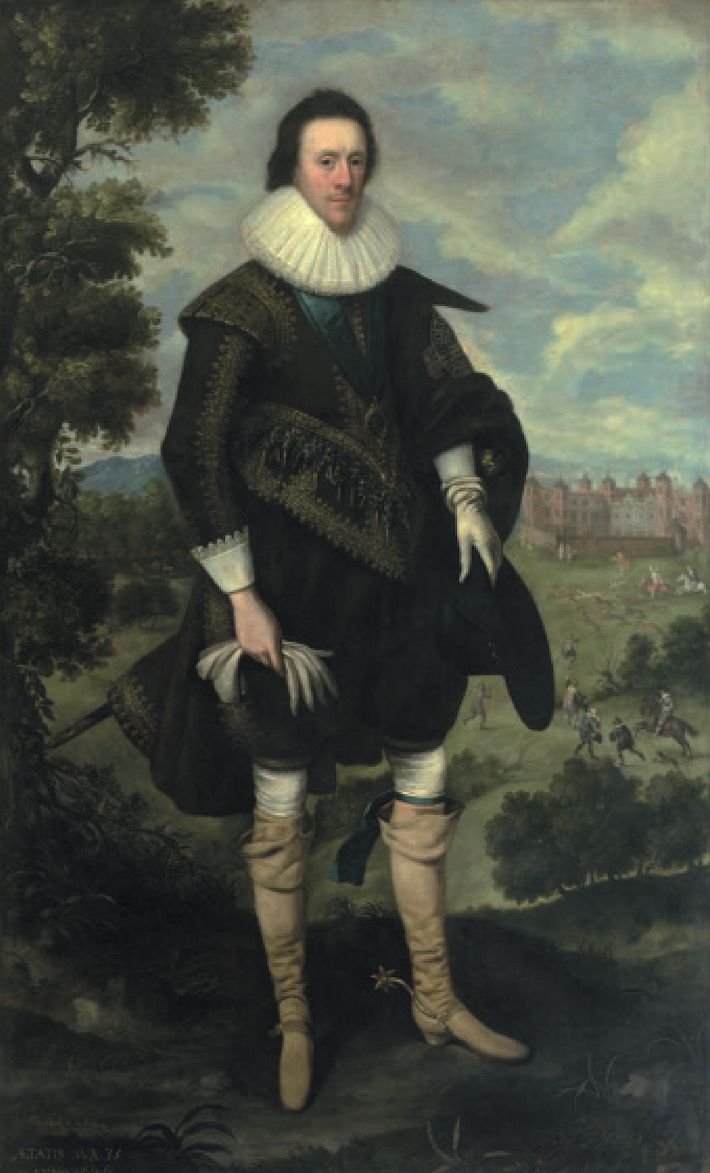
English peer, nobleman and politician. William Cecil, 2nd Earl of Salisbury

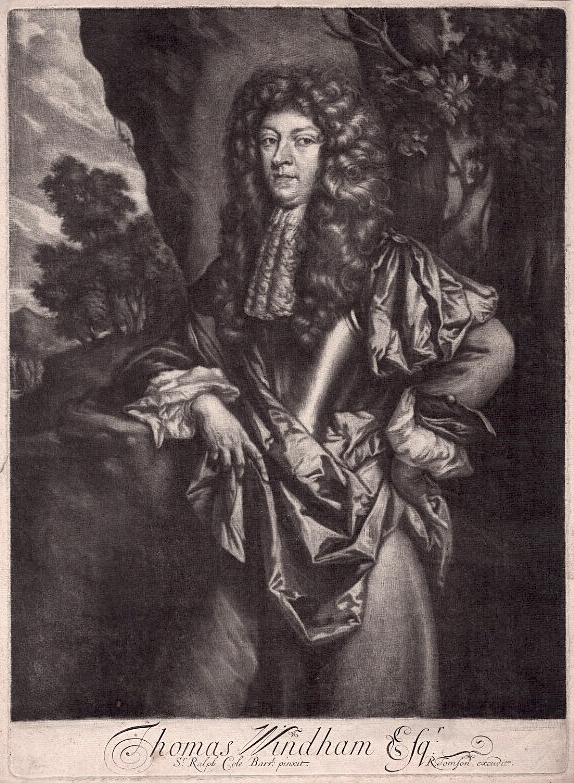
English politician and twice elected MP for Wells, Somerset Thomas Wyndham

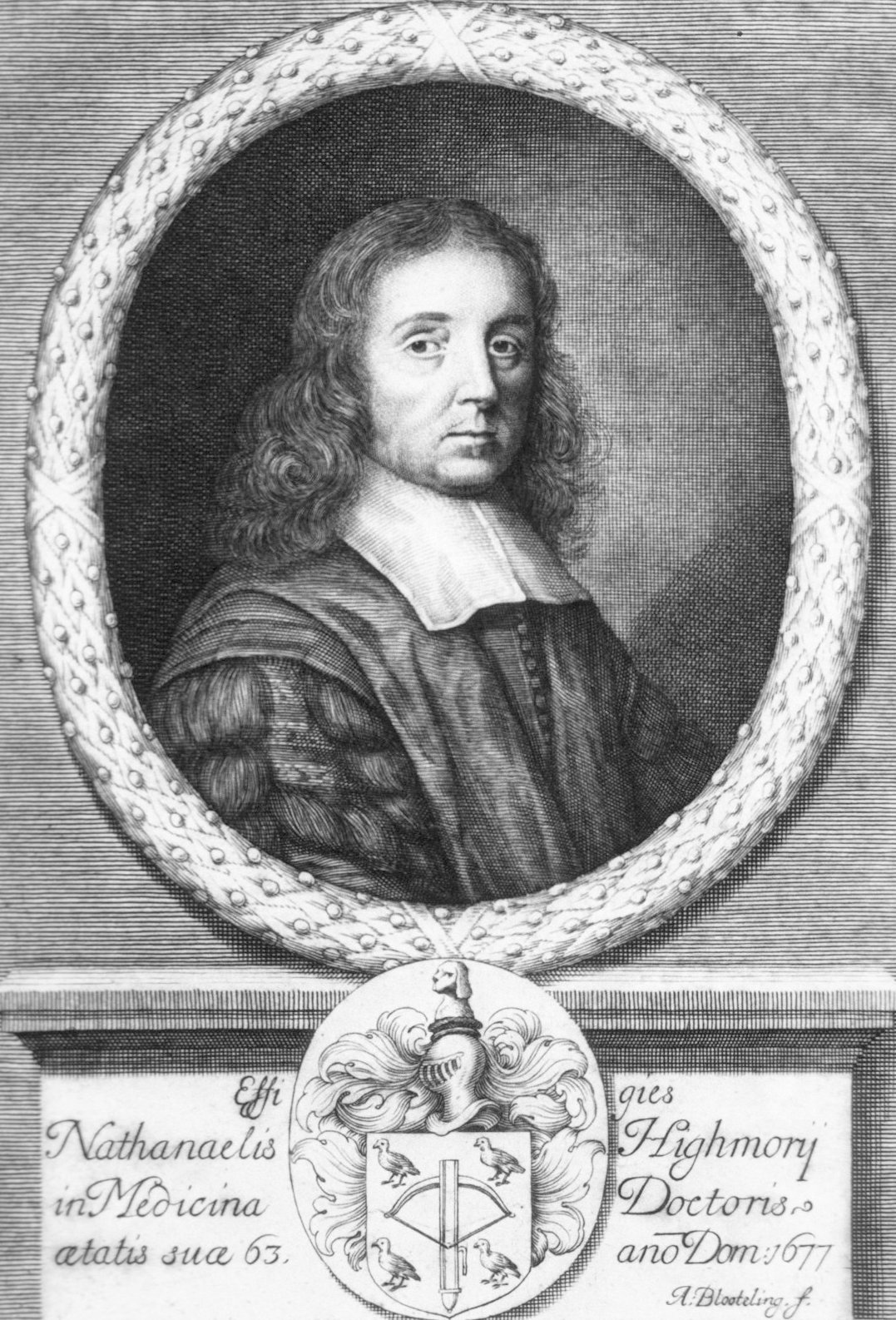
English surgeon and pioneering anatomist Nathaniel Highmore

Sherborne is a British full boarding public school located in the town of Sherborne in north-west Dorset.

Founded in 705 AD by Aldhelm and, following the dissolution of the monasteries, re-founded in 1550 by King Edward VI, it is one of the oldest schools in the United Kingdom in England.

The following list comprises some notable old boys of Sherborne School who were born between the 9th and 17th centuries.

== 9th century ==
- Alfred the Great (c. 849 – 901), son of Aethelwulf, king of the West Saxons, king of the Anglo Saxons, reputed to be one of the school's early pupils

== 11th century ==
- Stephen Harding (c. 1055 – 1134), founded Cîteaux Abbey and some twelve other abbeys, introduced the Cistercian Rule.

== 16th century ==
- Thomas Lyte (1568–1638), antiquarian, son of Henry Lyte of Lytes Cary, member of Clifford's Inn and Middle Temple, one of the four collectors of the Subsidy in Somerset.
- William Englebert (died 1634), engineer, son of N. Englebert, pension of 100 marks from Queen Elizabeth I.
- Sir George Horsey (died 1640), land reclaimer, son of Sir Ralph Horsey and Edith Mohun, knighted 1631.
- John Falconer (Jesuit) (1577–1656), English Jesuit and theologian, son of Henry Falconer of Lytton, admitted to English College, Rome under assumed name of Dingley 1598
- Richard Wright (1568–1639), MP for Dorchester 1597–1598, son of R Wright of Sturminster Newton, Magdalen College, Oxford.
- Thomas Winniffe (1576–1654), English churchman, chaplain to Charles I, Bishop of Lincoln.
- William Cecil, 2nd Earl of Salisbury, KG PC (1591-1668), English peer, nobleman, and politician.

== 17th century ==
- Nathaniel Highmore (1613–1685), surgeon, son of Rev Nathaniel Highmore of Purse Caundle, noted for his anatomical studies and treatise on human anatomy and blood circulation.
- Thomas Speed (1623–1703), merchant and Quaker, son of R Speed, Sherborne, Exeter College, Oxford, minister of St. Philip's Bristol, turned merchant and became a Quaker.
- Hugh Hodges lawyer, MP and judge, son of H Hodges of Sherborne, Queen's College, Oxford, Lincoln's Inn, recorder and MP for Bridport, recorder of Dorchester
- Obadiah Wills (born 1625), son of R Wills of Sherborne, Exeter College, Oxford, MA 1649 by favour of Fairfax and Cromwell, Fellow New College, Oxford.
- Thomas Chafe (MP) (born 1625), barrister-at-Law, MP, son of Thomas Chafe MP, Wadham College, Oxford, MP for Bridport.
- Dr William Thornton son of William Thornton of Milborne Port, Wadham College, Oxford, Fellow, principal of Hart Hall, Oxford.
- Colonel Richard Newman (1639–1695), barrister-at-Law, son of Richard Newman of Fifehead Magdalen, Pembroke College, Oxford, Middle Temple, High Steward of Westminster, imprisoned by Oliver Cromwell.
- Thomas Wyndham, (c. 1642 – 1689), MP, son of son of John Wyndham of Orchard Wyndham, Somerset, Wadham College, Oxford, recorder of Wells, MP for Wells.
- Henry Barker, (1657–1740), son of Rev Joseph Barker of Sherborne, Trinity College, Oxford, Canon of Westminster.
- Sir Francis Warre Bt MP, (c. 1659–1718), son of Sir John Warre MP of Hestercombe, Somerset.
- James Farewell (1666–1689), author of 'The Irish Hudibras', son of T Farewell of Horsington, Wadham College, Oxford, Lincoln's Inn.
- Giles Strangways (1677-1698), son of Colonel Thomas Strangways MP of Melbury Sampford, Dorset, kinsman of the Earl of Ilchester.
- Sir Richard Newman Bt, (1675–1721), son of Richard Newman of Evercreech Park, Pembroke College, Oxford.
- Peter Curgenven (1682–1729), son of William Curgenven of Cornwall, East India Company, merchant in India, captured by pirates 1720.

== See also ==
- Notable Old Shirburnians born in the 18th century
- Notable Old Shirburnians born in the 19th century
- List of Old Shirburnians
