= List of Old Shirburnians born in the 19th century =

Sherborne is a British full boarding Public School located in the town of Sherborne in north-west Dorset.

Founded in 705 AD by Aldhelm and, following the dissolution of the monasteries, re-founded in 1550 by King Edward VI, it is one of the oldest schools in the United Kingdom and also in England.

The following are some of the notable old boys of Sherborne School who were born in the 19th century.

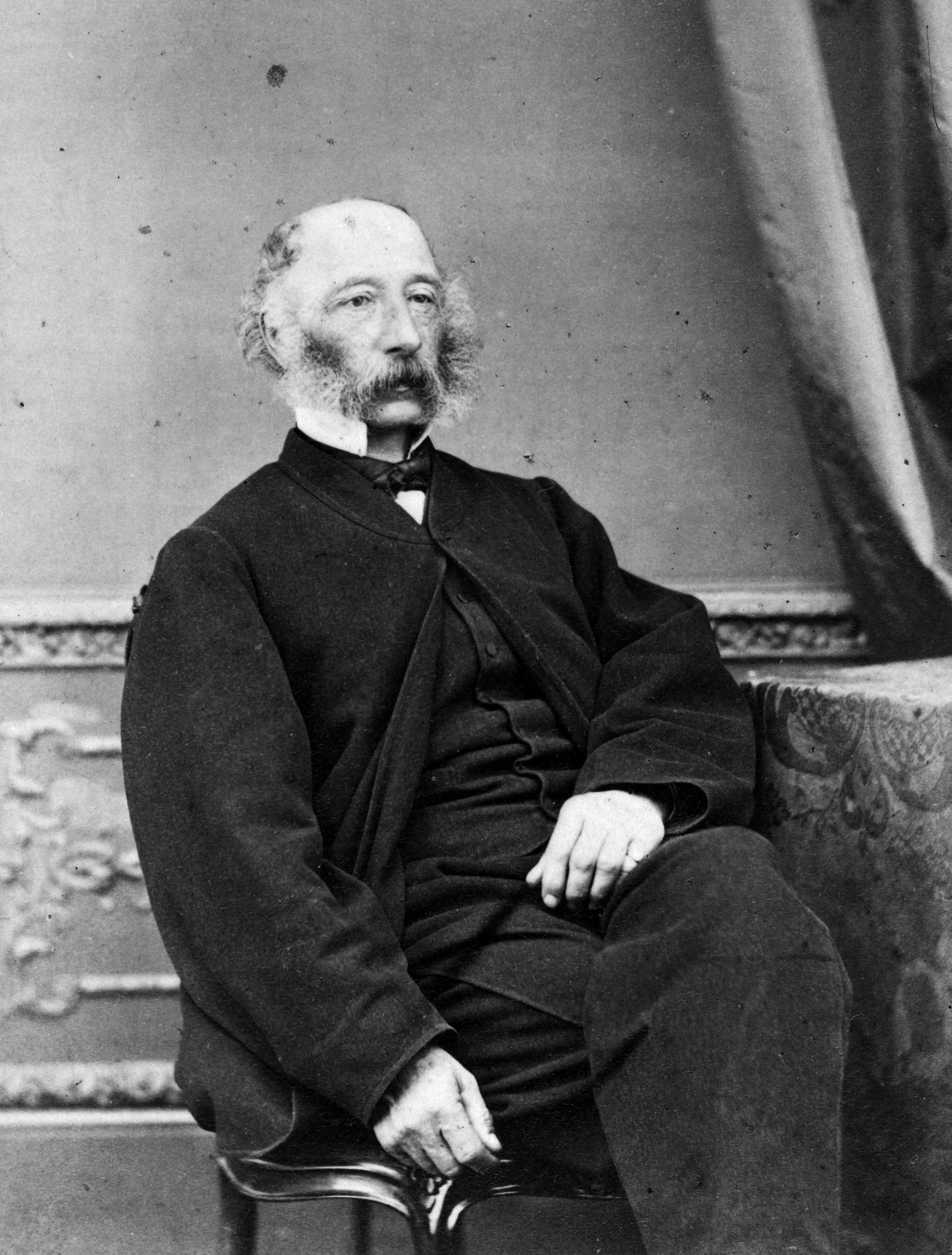
Speaker of the House of Representatives, New Zealand Sir William Fitzherbert

QC and Conservative MP William Forsyth (barrister)

== 1801 to 1809 ==
- Sir William Coles Medlycott, 2nd Bt, (1806–1882), son of Sir William Coles Medlycott, 1st Bt, of Ven House in Somerset, succeeded as 2nd Baronet 1835.
- Rev Prof Philip Kelland PRSE FRS (1808-1879), son of Rev William Kelland of Landcross, Bideford, English mathematician.

== 1810s ==
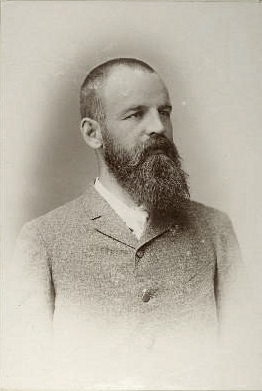
Diplomatist and intelligence officer in the Crimea Charles Robert Cattley

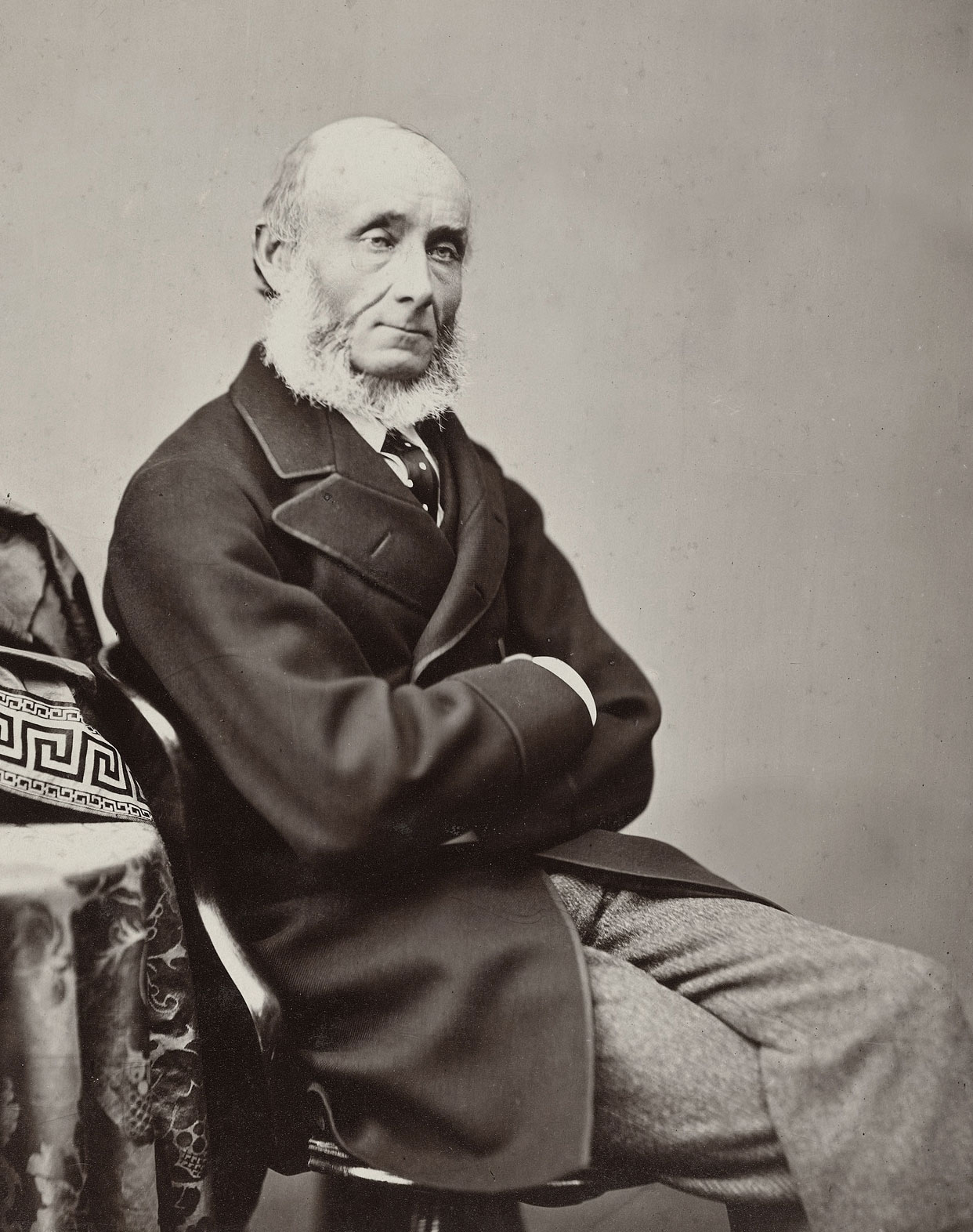
International lawyer Mountague Bernard

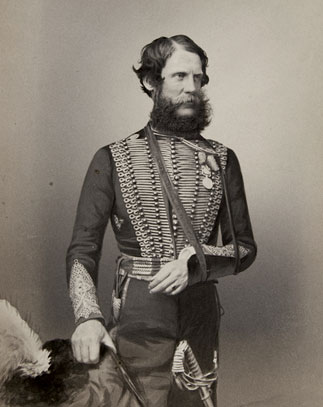
Crown Equerry in the Royal Household Colonel Sir George Ashley Maude

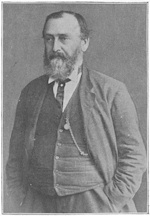
Designer of the Metford rifling William Ellis Metford

- Sir William Fitzherbert KCMG (1810-1891), son of Rev Samuel Fitzherbert, Queens' College, Cambridge, Speaker of the House of Representatives, New Zealand.
- Harry, Earl of Stamford, (1812-1890), son of Rev Harry Grey, English peer.
- William Forsyth, QC MP, (1812–1899), son of Thomas Forsyth of Renfrewshire, lawyer and ConservativeMP and elder brother of Sir Thomas Douglas Forsyth.
- John Mason Neale, (1818-1866), Anglican priest, scholar and hymnwriter.
- Edmund Chisholm Batten, FRSE (1817-1897), son of John Batten of Yeovil, Dorset, antiquarian and author of legal treatises.
- Charles Robert Cattley, (1817–1855), son of Robert Cattley of St Petersburg, Russia, diplomatist and intelligence officer in the Crimea.
- Sir John Nugent Humble Bt, (1818–1886), son of Sir John Nugent Humble Bt of Waterford, Christ Church, Oxford, succeeded as 2nd Baronet 1834.
- Baxter Langley, (1819-1892), radical political activist and newspaper editor.

== 1820s ==
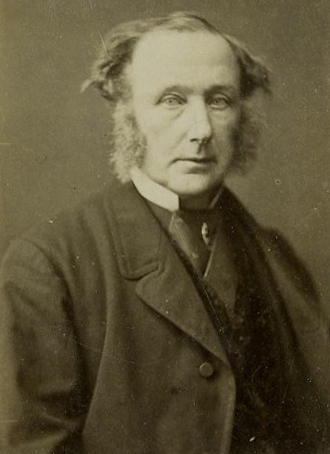
Anglo-Indian administrator and diplomat Sir Thomas Douglas Forsyth

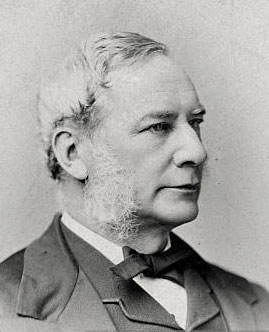
Professor of Greek and Latin at Johns Hopkins University Charles D'Urban Morris

- Mountague Bernard, (1820-1882), son of Charles Bernard of Jamaica and Tibberton Court, Gloucestershire, Trinity College, Oxford, English international lawyer, one of the Royal Commission appointed to arrange Treaty with USA.
- Henry Douglas (bishop), (1821-1875), son of Henry Alexander Douglas, Balliol College, Oxford, third Bishop of Bombay.
- Woodforde Ffooks MA JP, Exeter College, Oxford, Inner Temple, County Court Judge.
- George Tottenham MA (1825-1911), son of Lord Robert Ponsonby Tottenham Loftus, Dean of Clogher from 1900 to 1903.
- Colonel Sir George Ashley Maude KCB, son of Hon and Rev J C Maude of Enniskillen, Ireland, Crown Equerry of the Royal Mews in the Royal Household of the Sovereign of the United Kingdom 1859–1894.
- Maj General Sir Charles Walters D'Oyly Bt, son of Sir John Hadley D'Oyly Bt of Steepleton House, Blandford, ADC to Governor General of India, succeeded to Baronetcy 1869.
- Sir Thomas Grove, 1st Baronet JP DL, (1823-1897), son of Thomas Grove of Ferne, Wilts, MP for South Wilts, High Sheriff, created a baronet 1874.
- William Ellis Metford, (1824-1899), son of Dr William Metford of Flook House, Taunton, designed the Metford rifling used in the .303 calibre Lee–Metford and Martini–Metford service rifles in the late 19th century.
- Sir Thomas Douglas Forsyth, (1827-1886), son of Thomas Forsyth of Birchfield, Liverpool, Anglo-Indian administrator and diplomat and younger brother of William Forsyth.
- Rear-Admiral Henry James Raby, VC CB (1827-1907), son of Arthur Turnour Raby of Wells, senior Royal Naval Officer and recipient of the Victoria Cross.

== 1830s ==
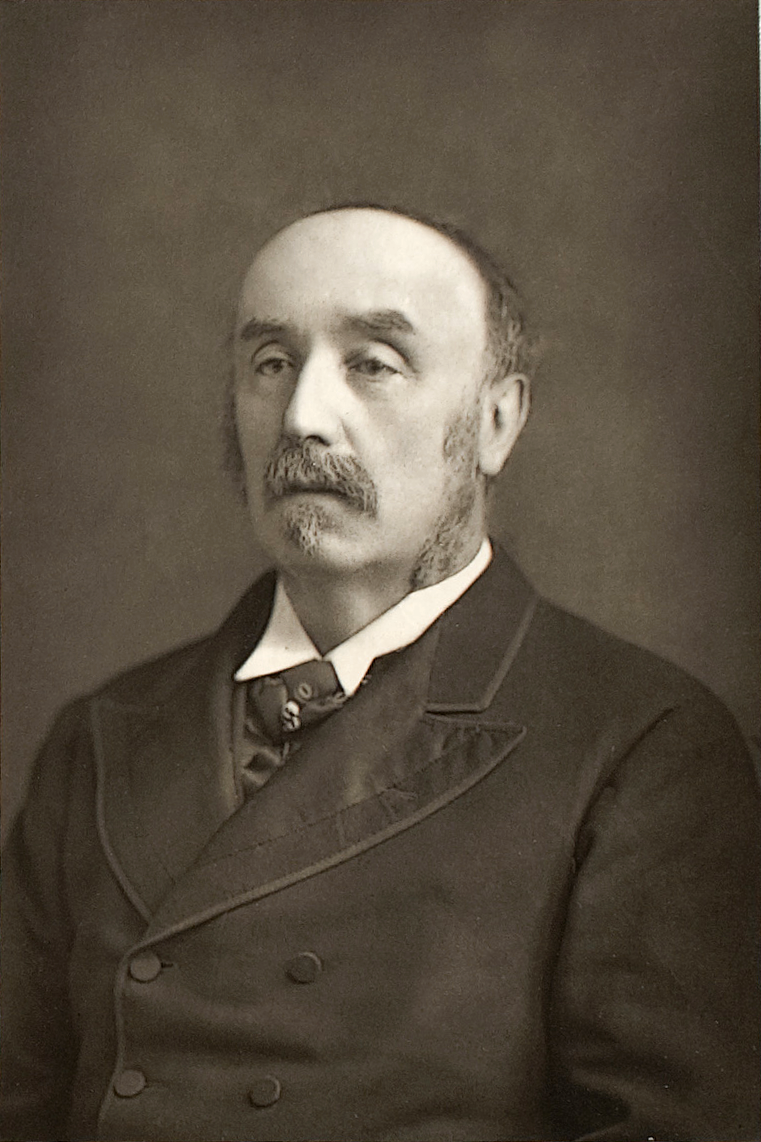
academic, politician and poet Sir Lewis Morris

- Sir Lewis Morris, (1833-1907), son of Lewis Edward William Morris, a Welsh academic and politician, also a popular poet of the Anglo-Welsh school.
- Lt-Colonel Alfred Wyndham, son of Captain Alexander Wyndham of West Lodge, Blandford, emigrated to Canada, Commanded 12th Battalion of the York Rangers in the North West Rebellion of 1885, artist.
- Charles Gresford Edmondes, (1838–1893), son of Rev Thomas Edmondes of Llanblethian, Professor of Classics, archdeacon and college principal.

== 1840s ==
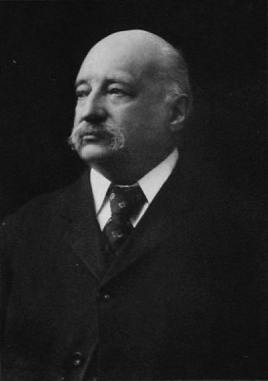
literary scholar and poet Ernest Hartley Coleridge

- Thomas Stevens, DD FSA, (1841-1920), son of Thomas Ogden Stevens of Salisbury, Anglican bishop, the first Bishop of Barking.
- Colonel Sir Arthur George Hammond, VC, KCB, DSO, (1843-1919), son of Major T J Hammond of Sherborne, Dorset, Army Officer, recipient of the Victoria Cross, the highest and most prestigious award for gallantry in the face of the enemy that can be awarded to British and Commonwealth forces.
- Sir Nathaniel Joseph Highmore GBE KCB (1844-1924), son of Dr William Highmore of Sherborne, Dorset, Barrister Middle Temple, Solicitor for H M Customs, Secretary to War Trade Dept, author of several works on Revenue Law.
- Walter Buckler Lethbridge, (1845-1907), son of Sir John Hesketh Lethbridge 3rd Bt, of Weymouth, Knight of the Order of Charles III of Spain, and the Medjidie.
- Sir George Clément Bertram son of George Bertram of St Heliers, Jersey, Trinity College, Cambridge, Barrister Inner Temple, Attorney-General for Jersey, Bailiff of Jersey.
- Ernest Hartley Coleridge (1846–1920), son of Rev Preb Derwent Coleridge and grandson of Samuel Taylor Coleridge, a British literary scholar and poet.
- Thomas Ryburn Buchanan, PC FRSE (1846-1911), son of John Buchanan of Glasgow, a Scottish Liberal politician and bibliophile.

== 1850s ==
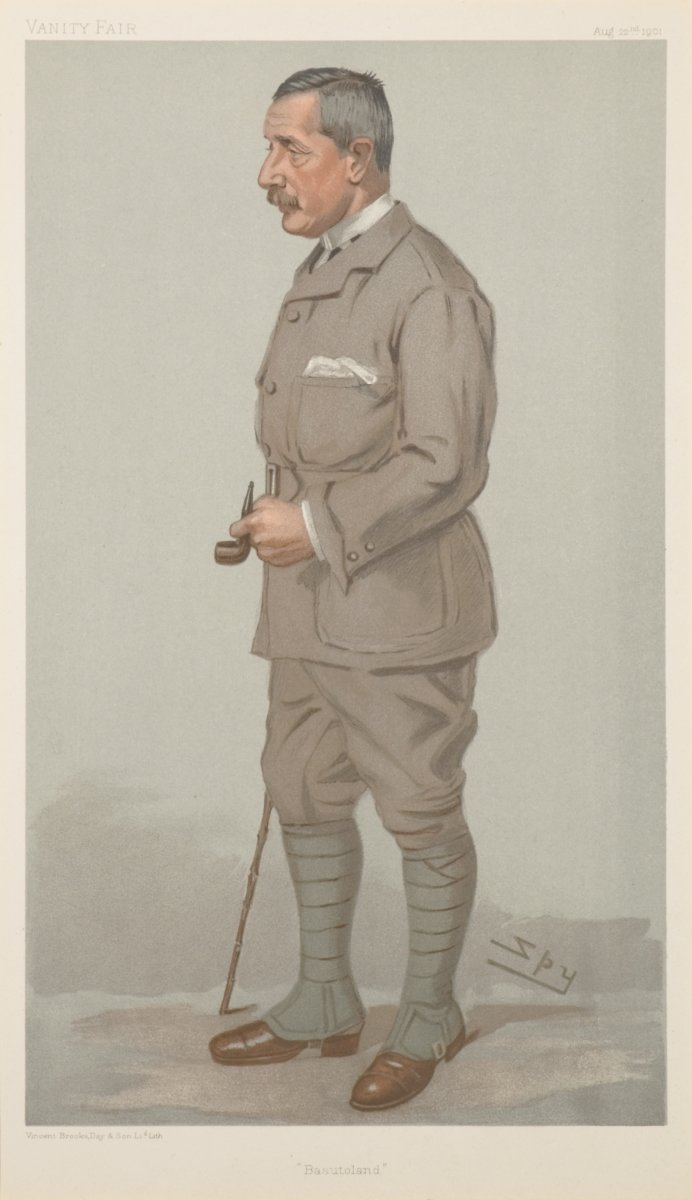
British colonial administrator in Africa Sir Godfrey Yeatman Lagden

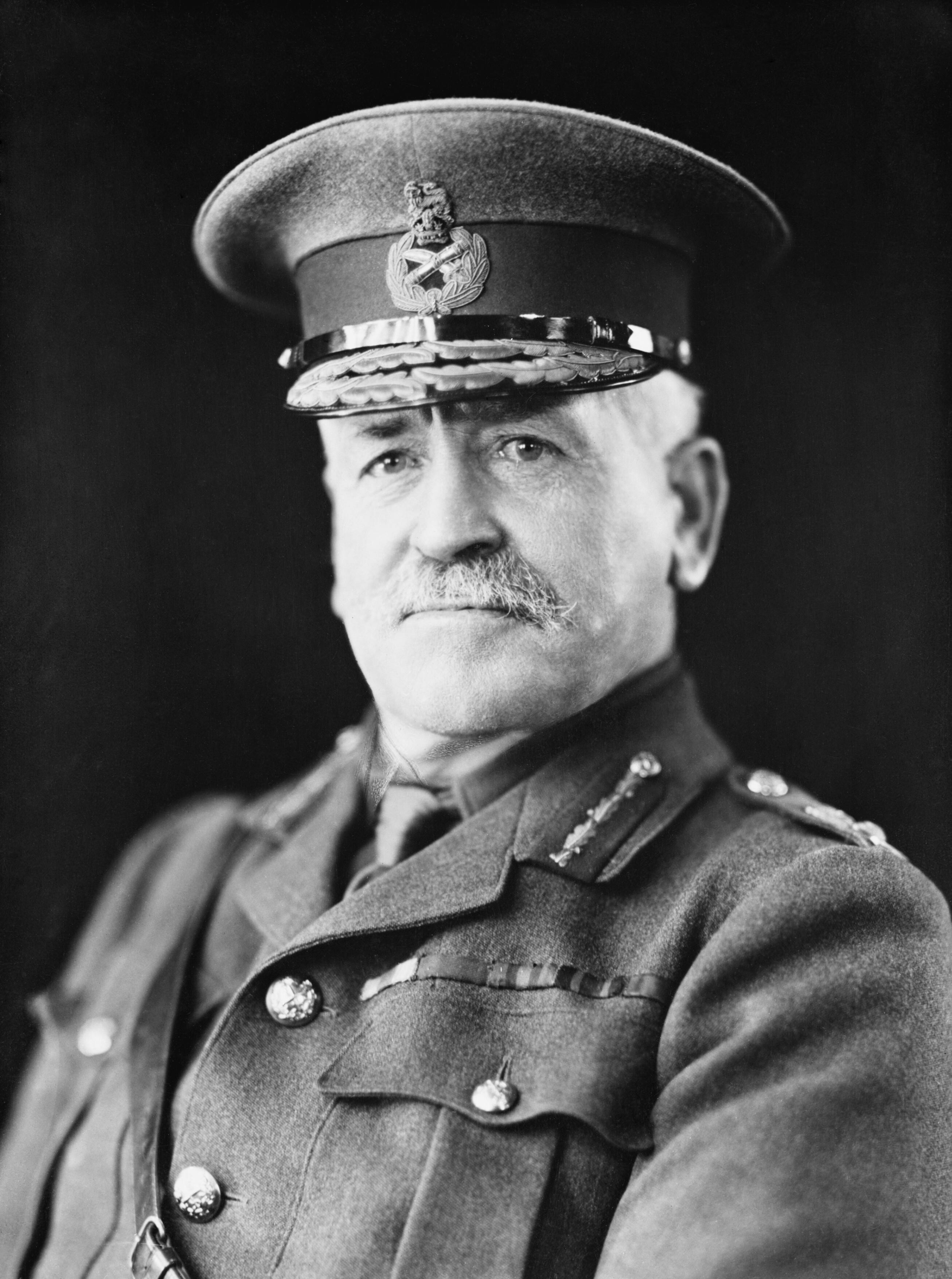
Commander-in-Chief of India, Governor of Gibraltar General Sir Charles Carmichael Monro Bt

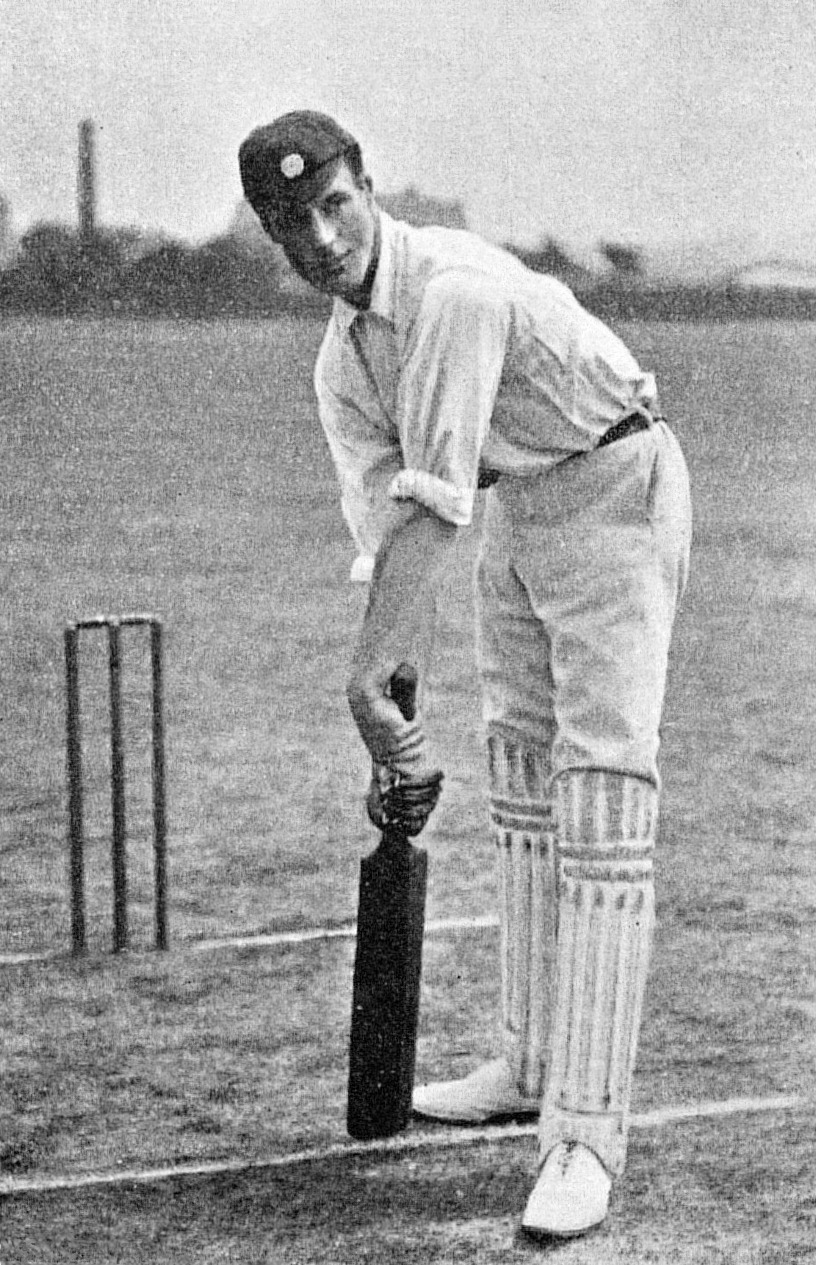
First class cricketer Sir Francis Eden Lacey

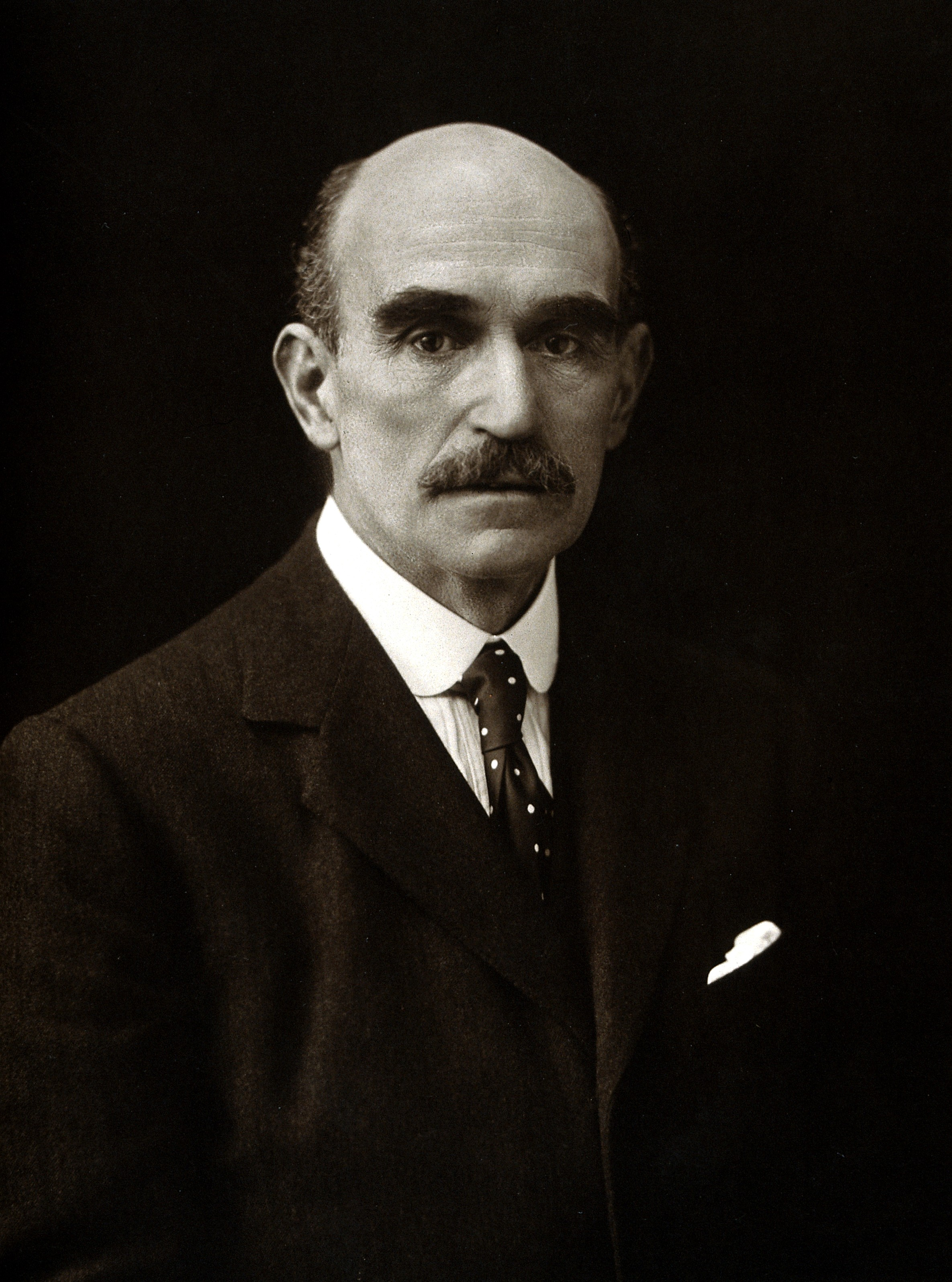
president of the Royal College of Surgeons of Edinburgh Sir James William Beeman Hodsdon

- Brigadier-General Sir Edward Raban, CB KCB KBE (1850-1927), on staff of Lord French 1916–1917.
- Sir Godfrey Yeatman Lagden KCMG KBE (1851-1934), a British colonial administrator in Africa.
- Edward Smith (1854–1909), first-class cricketer and clergyman
- Arthur Younghusband (1854-1931), son of Lieutenant-General Robert Romer Younghusband, British civil servant of the Raj.
- Dr Philip Arthur Ashworth, BA MA Dr Jur (1853-1921), son of Rev John Ashworth Ashworth of Berkshire, international lawyer, Barrister, jurist, and author, editor and translator of important works on jurisprudence, constitutional law and military theory.
- Henry Brougham Guppy, FRS FRSE FLS (1854-1926), British surgeon, geologist, botanist and photographer, awarded the Linnean Medal in 1917.
- Lord John Henry Loftus, (1851–1925), 5th Earl of Ely, 5th Viscount Loftus, 5th Baron Loftus, son of Rev the Lord Adam Loftus of Loftus Hall, Wexford.
- Sir Edward William Wallington, KCVO GCVO (1854-1933), son of Colonel Sir John Wallington of Trowbridge, Oriel College, Oxford, private secretary to Governor of New South Wales (Lord Carrington); to Governors of Victoria (Lord Hopetoun and Lord Brassey); to-Governors of South Australia (Sir T. F.Buxton and Lord Tennyson), to Governor-General of Australia (Lord Linlithgow, Groom of the Bedchamber to Prince of Wales, Groom-in-Waiting to the King, Private Secretary to the Queen, Treasurer to the Queen.
- Arthur Upcott, DD, MA (1857-1922), son of J. S. Upcott of Cullompton, an Anglican priest and educationalist.
- Henry Whitehead DD CBE, (1853-1947), Bishop of Madras, Fellow of Trinity College, Oxford, author of Christ in the Indian Villages.
- Francis William Galpin FLS DLitt, (1858-1945), son of John Galpin of Dorchester, English cleric and antiquarian musicologist.
- Henry Henn, (1858-1931), son of Professor T R Henn of Kildysart QC of co Clare, Bishop of Burnley.

== 1860s ==
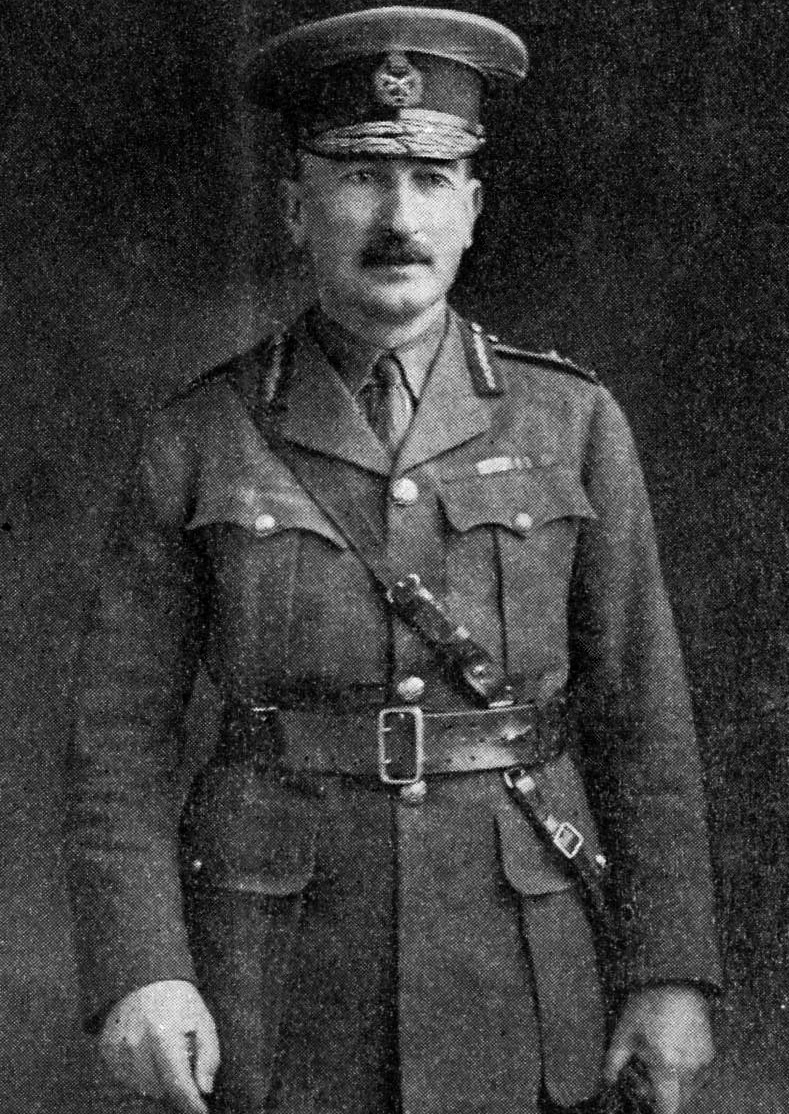
British Army officer in WWI Field Marshal Sir Claud William Jacob

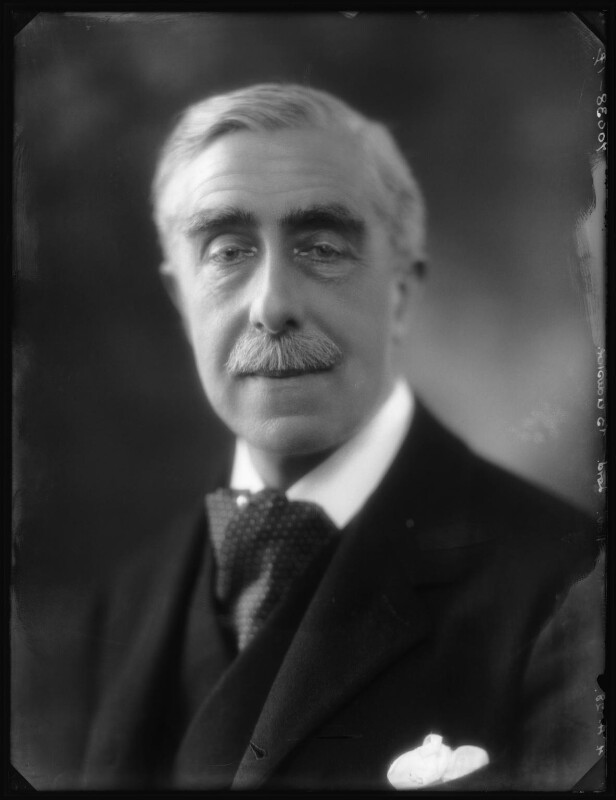
Conservative MP and Governor-General of New Zealand Charles Bathurst, Viscount Bledisloe

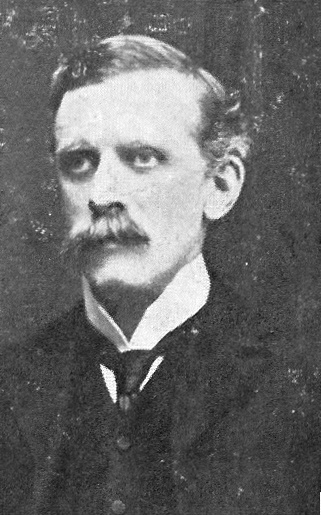
Liberal MP, barrister, administrator, journalist, historian and writer Sir Harry Evan Auguste Cotton

- Charles Barton DSO (1860–1919), first-class cricketer and British Army officer
- Francis George Hall, (1860-1901), son of Lieutenant-Colonel E. Hall of Bruton, Somerset, British administrator in East Africa.
- General Sir Charles Carmichael Monro Bt, GCB, GCSI, GCMG (1860-1929) son of Henry Monro of Portland, Australia, senior British Army officer, Commander-in-Chief of India, Governor of Gibraltar.
- Sir Francis Eden Lacey (1859-1946), son of W C Lacey of Wareham, Barrister and First Class Cricketer.
- Brig-General Gilbert Boys Smith, (d1937) son of Rev G E Smith of Somerton.
- Sir James William Beeman Hodsdon, KBE PRCSE (1858-1928), son Adelaide Horne Ingham of Hamilton, Bermuda, eminent surgeon, president of the Royal College of Surgeons of Edinburgh.
- Edward William Bastard, (1862-1901), son of Rev Henry Horlock Bastard of Taunton, English first-class cricketer who played for Oxford University and Somerset.
- Herbert Arnould Olivier, (1861-1952), son of Rev. H. A. Olivier of Potterne, Wiltshire, and uncle to Laurence Olivier, British artist known for his portrait and landscape paintings.
- Field Marshal Sir Claud William Jacob, GCB, GCSI, KCMG, (1863-1948), son of Major-General W Jacob of Tavistock, British Indian Army officer.
- Alfred North Whitehead, OM FRS FBA (1861-1947), son of Rev Arthur Whitehead of Thanet, English mathematician and philosopher.
- Francis John Lys, (1863–1947), son of F D Lys of Bere Regis, Vice-Chancellor of Oxford University.
- Brigadier General Henry Stanhope Sloman, CMG, DSO, (1861–1945), son of Major J Sloman of Taunton, senior British Army officer during the First World War.
- Sir Hugh Corbet Vincent, son of Rev James Crawley Vincent of Upper Bangor, solicitor and rugby union player.
- Brigadier-General Ernest Douglas Money CIE CVO DSO, (1866-1952), son of Major-General R C Money of Sherborne, a senior British Indian Army officer.
- Arthur Waugh, (1866-1943), son of Alexander Waugh MD of Midsomer Norton, Bath, publisher, the father of the authors Alec Waugh and Evelyn Waugh.
- Frank Selwyn Macaulay Bennett, (1866-1947), son of H E Bennett of Sparkford, a reforming Dean of Chester, Anglican scholar and author.
- Charles Bathurst, Viscount Bledisloe, FSA KBE PC GCMG, (1867-1958), son of Charles Bathurst of Lydney Park, Gloucestershire, Barrister, British Conservative politician and Governor-General of New Zealand.
- Sir Harry Evan Auguste Cotton, CIE (1868-1939), son of Sir Henry John Stedman Cotton, a Liberal politician, barrister, administrator, journalist, historian and writer.
- Sir Cecil Algernon Cochrane (1869-1960), son of William Cochrane, British Liberal Party politician.
- Lieutenant-Colonel Reginald Vincent Kempenfelt Applin, DSO, OBE (1869-1957), son of Captain Vincent Jesson Applin of Chelston Manor, Torquay, British military officer and Conservative Party member of parliament.
- Neville Lovett, CBE (1869-1951), son of Rev R Lovett of Bishop's Caundle, Bishop of Portsmouth and Bishop of Salisbury.

== 1870s ==
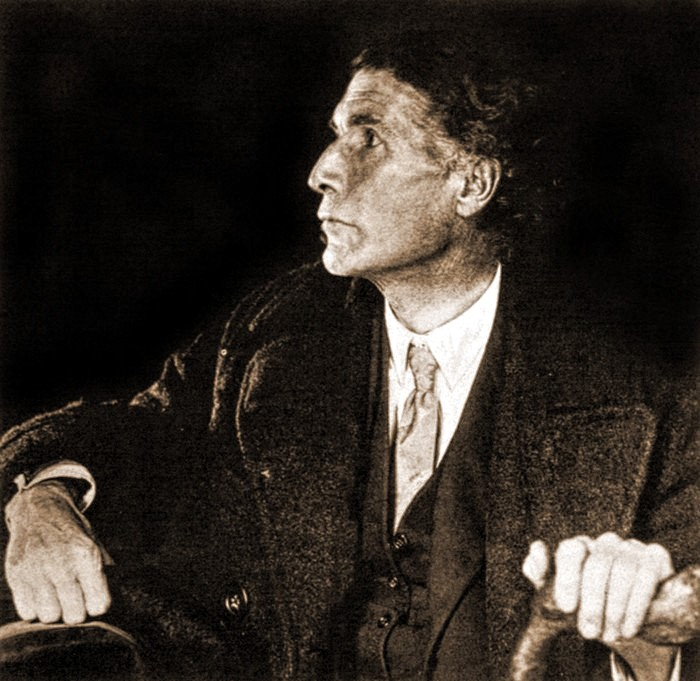
Philosopher, lecturer, novelist, literary critic, and poet John Cowper Powys

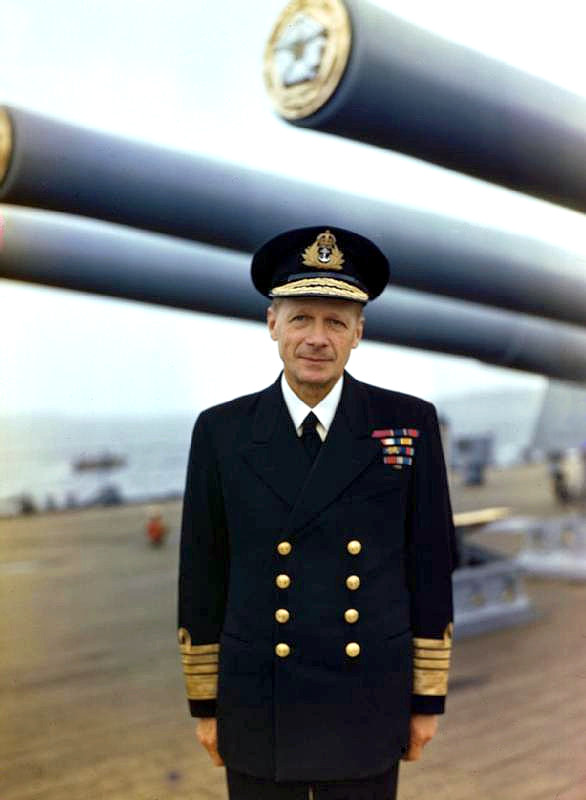
Last admiral to command Home Fleet during World War II Admiral Sir Henry Ruthven Moore

- Charles Augustus Kincaid, CVO (1870–1954), high court judge in India and a prolific author.
- Admiral Walter Maurice Ellerton CB (1870-1948), son of Rev John Ellerton of Barnes, Royal Navy officer, Commander-in-Chief, East Indies Station, ADC to King George V.
- The Reverend Canon Henry Spencer Stephenson (1871-1957), son of Lt-Colonel Sussex Vane Stephenson, Chaplain to King George VI and Queen Elizabeth II, participating in the coronation procession of Queen Elizabeth.
- John Cowper Powys, (1872-1963), son of Reverend Charles Francis Powys of Montacute, British philosopher, lecturer, novelist, literary critic, and poet.
- Sir Edgar Joseph Holberton, (1874-1949), CBE KBE, son of J L Holberton of Staffordshire, Magdalene College, Cambridge Chairman of the Burma Chamber of Commerce .
- John Stevens (1875–1923), cricketer.
- Captain Sir Dudley Alan Lestock Clarke-Jervoise Bt, (1876-1933), son of Sir Arthur Clarke-Jervoise Bt, Tiverton, British Army officer, succeeded as 7th Baronet.
- Hugh Stanger-Leathes (1878–1949), first-class cricketer and honorary surgeon to George V.
- William Prichard (1879–1960), first-class cricketer and secretary of the St John Ambulance Association.
- Henry Roy Dean, MD LLD DSc FRCP (1879-1961), son of Joshua Dean of Bournemouth, professor of pathology at the University of Cambridge and Master of Trinity Hall, Cambridge.
- Harold William Vazeille Temperley, OBE, FBA (1879-1939), son of Ernest Temperley, British historian, Professor of Modern History at the University of Cambridge from 1931, Master of Peterhouse, Cambridge.

== 1880s ==
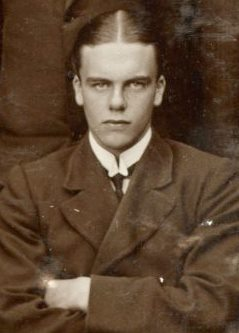
Novelist and crime writer Anthony Berkeley Cox

- Albert Powys, CBE, (1881–1936), son of Reverend Charles Francis Powys of Montacute, architect and Secretary of the Society for the Protection of Ancient Buildings for some 25 years, brother of John Cowper Powys, Llewelyn Powys, Theodore Francis Powys and Philippa Powys.
- General Sir Guy Charles Williams KCB CMG DSO, (1881-1959), son of Colonel R F Williams, British Army officer who served as General Officer Commanding-in-Chief Eastern Command during World War II.
- Christopher Stanger-Leathes (1881–1966), rugby union international
- Piers Holt Wilson, (1883-1956), son of G H Wilson of Suffolk, Bishop of Moray, Ross and Caithness.
- Francis Clive Savill Carey, CBE (1883-1968), son of F Carey of Burgess Hill, English baritone, singing teacher, composer, opera producer and folk song collector.
- Llewelyn Powys, (1884-1939), son of son of Reverend Charles Francis Powys of Montacute, British essayist and novelist, and brother of John Cowper Powys, Theodore Francis Powys and Philippa Powys.
- Geoffrey Charles Lester Lunt, MC (1885–1948), son of Rev Prebendary Lunt of Bath, Bishop of Ripon and Bishop of Salisbury.
- Robert Jesson (1886–1917), first-class cricketer
- Admiral Sir Henry Ruthven Moore GCB, CVO, DSO (1886-1978), son of Colonel Henry Moore of Minehead, the last British admiral to command Home Fleet during World War II.

== 1890s ==
- Anthony Berkeley Cox (1893-1971), novelist and crime writer who wrote under several pen-names including Francis Iles, Anthony Berkeley and A. Monmouth Platts.

== See also ==
- Notable Old Shirburnians born in the 8th to 17th centuries
- Notable Old Shirburnians born in the 18th century
