= Thomas Wyndham =

Thomas Wyndham may refer to:

- Thomas Wyndham of Felbrigg (died 1521), vice-admiral and counsellor to Henry VIII
- Thomas Wyndham (Royal Navy officer) (1508–1554), navigator and son of Thomas Wyndham (of Felbrigg)
- Thomas Wyndham (of Tale) (c. 1628–1713), Member of Parliament for Minehead and Yarmouth (Isle of Wight)
- Thomas Wyndham (of Witham Friary) (c. 1642–1689), Member of Parliament for Wells
- Thomas Wyndham (lawyer) (1662–1698), Member of Parliament for Wilton
- Thomas Wyndham, 1st Baron Wyndham (1681–1745), Lord Chancellor of Ireland
- Thomas Wyndham (of Clearwell Park) (c.1686–1752), Member of Parliament for Dunwich and Truro
- Thomas Wyndham (of Hammersmith) (c.1693–1777), Member of Parliament for Poole
- Thomas Wyndham (of Dunraven Castle) (c. 1763–1814), Member of Parliament for Glamorganshire
- Thomas Wyndham (clergyman) (1772–1862), English Doctor of Divinity
