= Nathaniel Highmore =

Nathaniel Highmore may refer to:

- Nathaniel Highmore (surgeon) (1613–1685), British surgeon and anatomist
- Sir Nathaniel Highmore (barrister) (1844–1924), British civil servant and barrister
