= List of Old Shirburnians born in the 18th century =

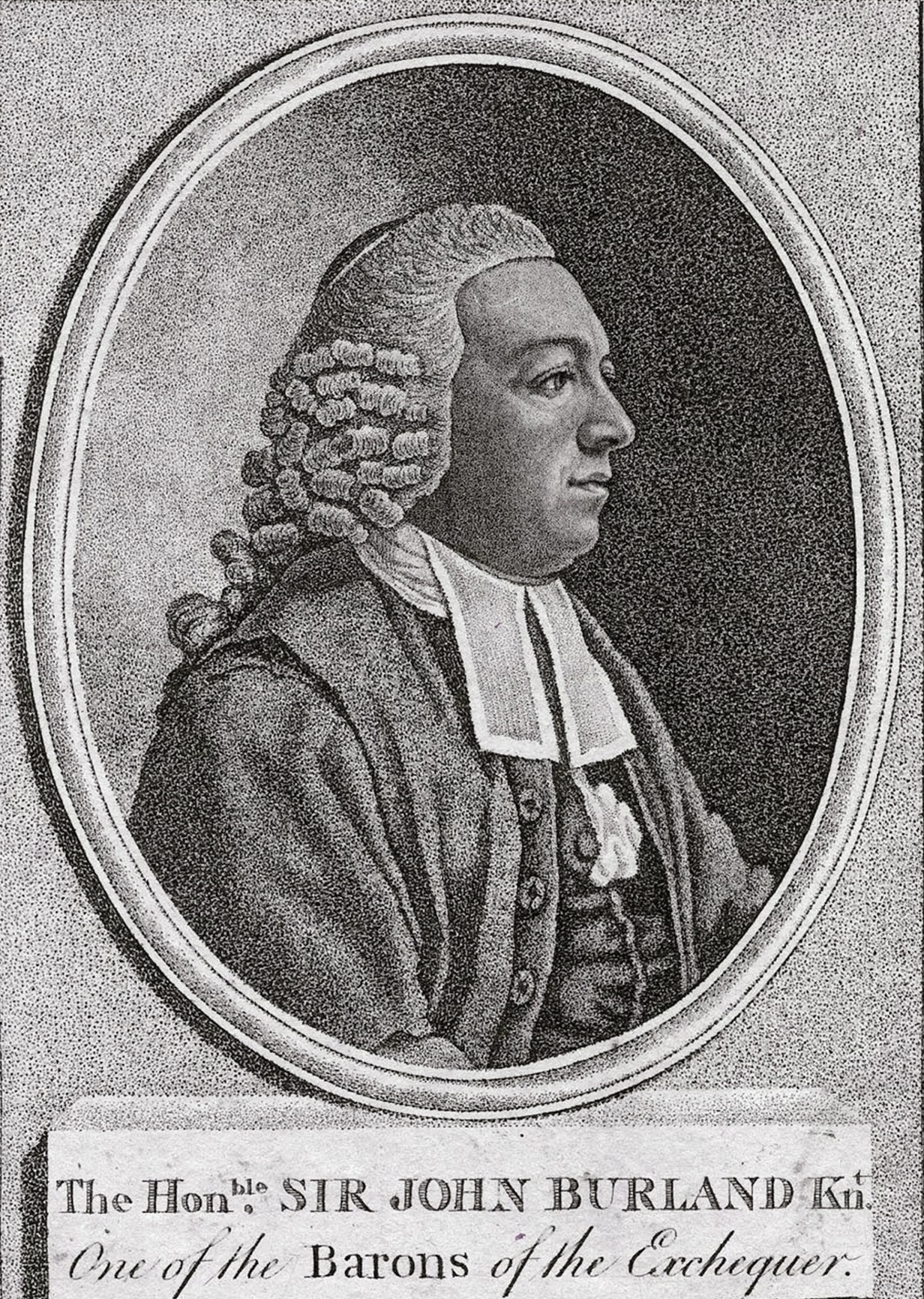
English barrister and judge Sir John Burland (1725-1776).

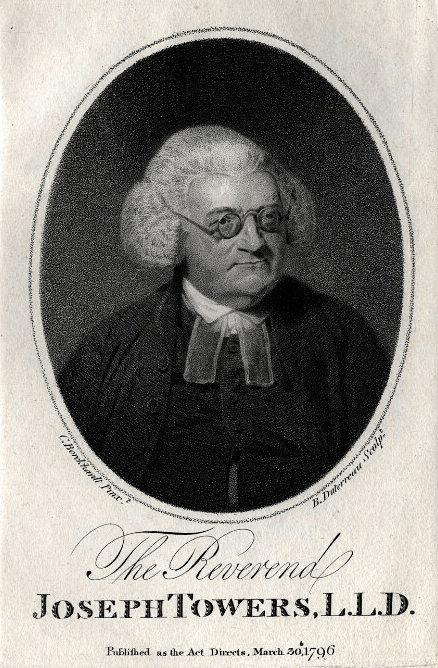
Dissenter and biographer Joseph Towers (1737-1799).

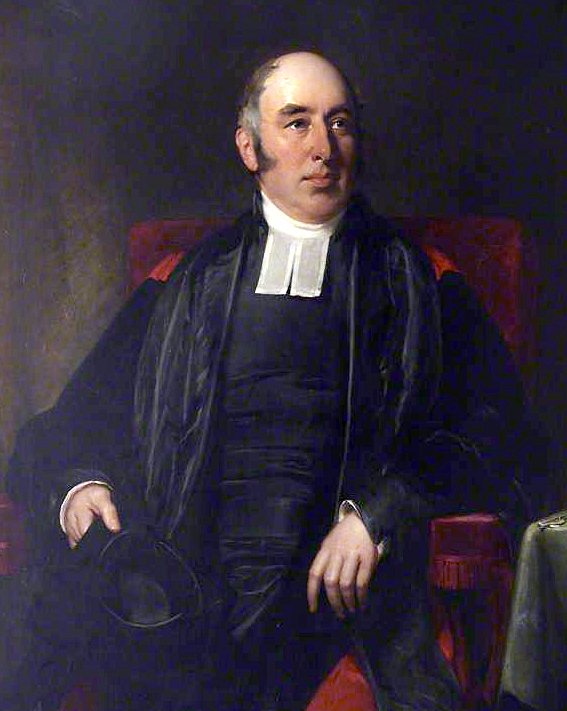
Fellow of Wadham College, Oxford, Vice-Chancellor of Oxford University Benjamin Parsons Symons (1785–1878).

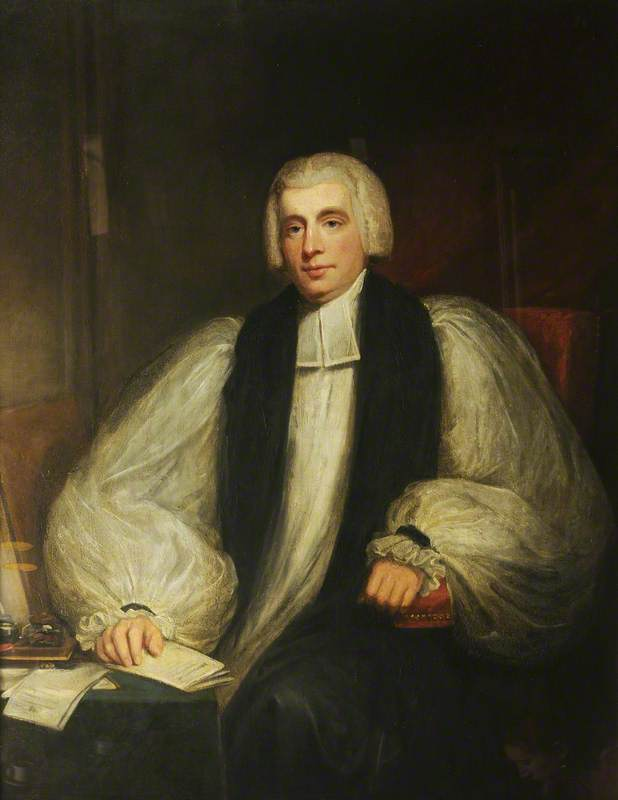
Bishop of Oxford Charles Moss (1763-1811).

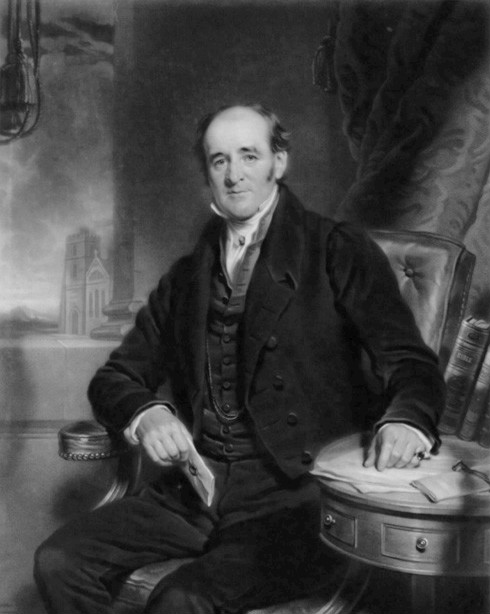
Dean of Llandaff William Bruce Knight (1786–1845).

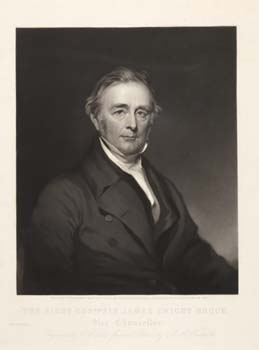
English barrister, judge and politician. Sir James Lewis Knight-Bruce (1791–1866).

Sherborne is a British full boarding Public School located in the town of Sherborne in north-west Dorset.

Founded in 705 AD by Aldhelm and, following the dissolution of the monasteries, re-founded in 1550 by King Edward VI, it is one of the oldest schools in the United Kingdom in England.

The following list comprises some notable old boys of Sherborne School who were born in the 18th century.

== 18th century ==
- James Bickham, MA BD DD, (1719-1785), son of James Bickham of Evercreech, Somerset, Fellow of Emmanuel College, Cambridge, Archdeacon of Leicester.
- William Thomas Putt, (1725-1785), son of Raymondo Putt of Gittisham, Devon, Fellow of Balliol College, Oxford, originator of the Tom Putt apple.], lawyer.
- Sir John Burland, (1725-1776), son of John Burland of Wells, Somerset, Balliol College, Oxford, judge.
- Joseph Towers, (1737-1799), of Southwark, London, Dissenter and biographer.
- Charles Moss, BD DD (1763-1811) son of Rev Dr Charles Moss Bishop of Bath and Wells, Christ Church, Oxford, clergyman and Bishop of Oxford.
- Dr Thomas Wyndham, BCL DCL (1772-1862), son of William Wyndham of Dinton, Wiltshire, Wadham College, Oxford, clergyman, vicar of Compton Chamberlain, Steward of Sherborne Anniversary Meeting 1804.
- Samuel March, son of Thomas March, More Crichel, Dorset Sidney Sussex College, Cambridge Inner Temple, lawyer, author and permanent under-secretary for home affairs.
- Charles March-Phillipps, MP, (1779-1862), son of Thomas March (later assumed the name of Phillipps), More Crichel, Dorset, and Garendon Park, Leicestershire, Trinity College, Cambridge, Whig politician.
- Benjamin Parsons Symons, BA DD (1785-1878), son of John Symons of Cheddar, Somerset, Fellow of Wadham College, Oxford, Vice-Chancellor of Oxford University.
- William Bruce Knight, (1786–1845), son of John Knight of Fairlinch, Devon, Exeter College, Oxford, Dean of Llandaff, for a wager, walked from Merthyr to Brecon and back, a distance of 86 miles, in 33 hours.
- Sir James Knight Bruce, DCL FSA FRS (1791–1866), son of John Knight of Fairlinch, Devon, brother of William Knight-Bruce, Barrister-at-Law, Lincoln's Inn, Lord Justice of Appeal (Chancery).
- William Dansey, BA MA (1792–1856), son of John Dansey of Blandford, Dorset, Exeter College, Oxford, Prebendary of Sarum, author of Harre Decanicre Rurales and other works.

== See also ==
- Notable Old Shirburnians born in the 8th to 17th centuries
- Notable Old Shirburnians born in the 19th century
