= Gabriel Plattes =

English writer

Gabriel Plattes (c.1600–1644) was an English writer on agriculture and science, and also now recognised as the author of the utopian work Description of the Famous Kingdome of Macaria, often attributed to Samuel Hartlib under whose name it was published.

== Life ==
He was one of the earliest advocates in England of an improved system of husbandry, and devoted time and money to practical experiments. He was in poverty at the end of his life and was supported by Hartlib, to whom he left his unpublished papers.

== Works ==
His Treatise of Husbandry (1638) concerns both agriculture and the relations of landlord and tenant. His later tracts mainly repeat under new titles information first published in the Treatise.

A Discoverie of Infinite Treasure was an early work in the fields of chemistry, metallurgy and geology. According to Allen Debus Plattes was heavily influenced by William Gilbert and the theory of magnetism. He wrote on the dowsing rod, colour and mineral composition, and the formation of geological features. Plattes dedicated the work to his patron and mentor William Englebert.

Generally opposed to alchemists, he wrote a catalogue of tricks associated with their claims, Caveat for Alchemists appearing in the Chymical, Medicinal, and Chyrurgical Addresses: Made to Samuel Hartlib of 1655. He was not, however, a sceptic; but raised also the issue of motivation in the search for transmutation into gold and the losses of the adept.

Other works were

- Observations and Improvements in Husbandry, with twenty Experiments, London, 1639.
- Recreatio Agriculturæ, London, 1640, 1646.
- The profitable Intelligencer, communicating his knowledge for the generall good of the Commonwealth and all Posterity, &c. [London, 1644].
