= A Description of the Famous Kingdome of Macaria =

1641 work of utopian fiction

A Description of the Famous Kingdome of Macaria is a work of utopian fiction, published in England in 1641. It carried the name of Samuel Hartlib, who published it, but is now attributed to Gabriel Plattes. A short text of fifteen pages, it reads, according to Amy Boesky, like a political address, and it was explicitly framed as an address to Parliament.

It is written as a dialogue, and is in the tradition of the Utopia of Thomas More — Macaria is an island mentioned in Utopia — and the New Atlantis of Francis Bacon. Hugh Trevor-Roper takes it to be an important formulation of the ultimate political ambitions of Hartlib and his followers (and in particular John Dury), in the form of a reformed Christian society and welfare state. It covers the issues of economic development, taxation and education. Much of the content drew on Henry Robinson's Englands Safety from earlier in the same year.
