= William Thornton (academic) =

English cleric and academic (died 1707)

William Thornton (died 1707) was an English cleric and academic, Principal of Hart Hall of the University of Oxford from 1688 until his death in 1707.

== Life ==
William Thornton was the son of William Thornton of Milborne Port in Somerset. He was educated at Sherborne School. He matriculated at Wadham College, Oxford in 1659, graduating B.A.in 1663 and M.A. in 1666. He became a Fellow of the College in 1667 and Sub-Warden in 1676.

Thornton was ordained priest in 1673, and became vicar of Southrop in 1679, holding the living to 1703. He was rector of Stone, Kent from 1702.
