= Thomas Wyndham (clergyman) =

English clergyman

Thomas Wyndham BCL DCL (1772-1862), was a 19th-century English Doctor of Divinity and scion of one of the most influential families in the West Country of England.

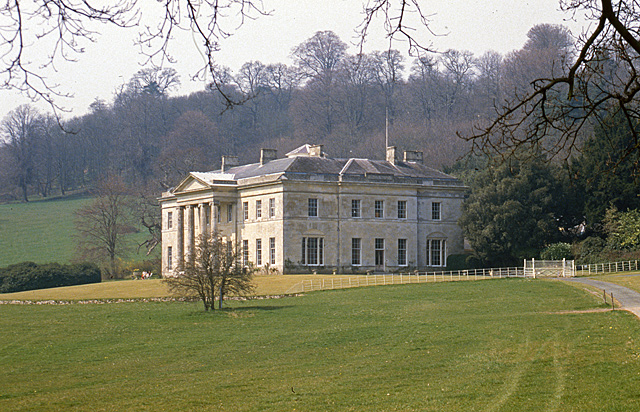
Dinton House, Wiltshire

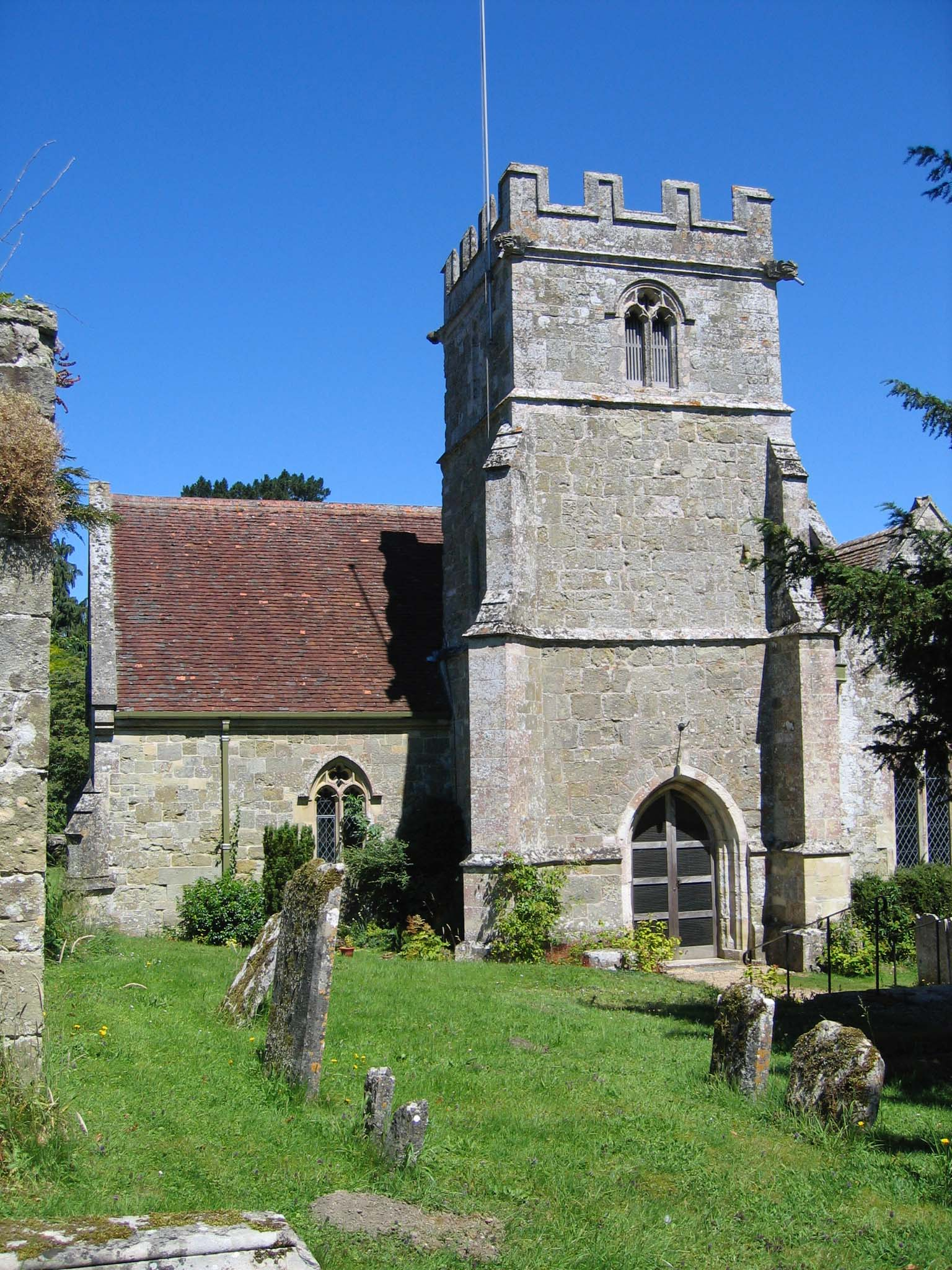
St. Michael's Church, Compton Chamberlayne, the Rev Dr Thomas Wyndham's first parish

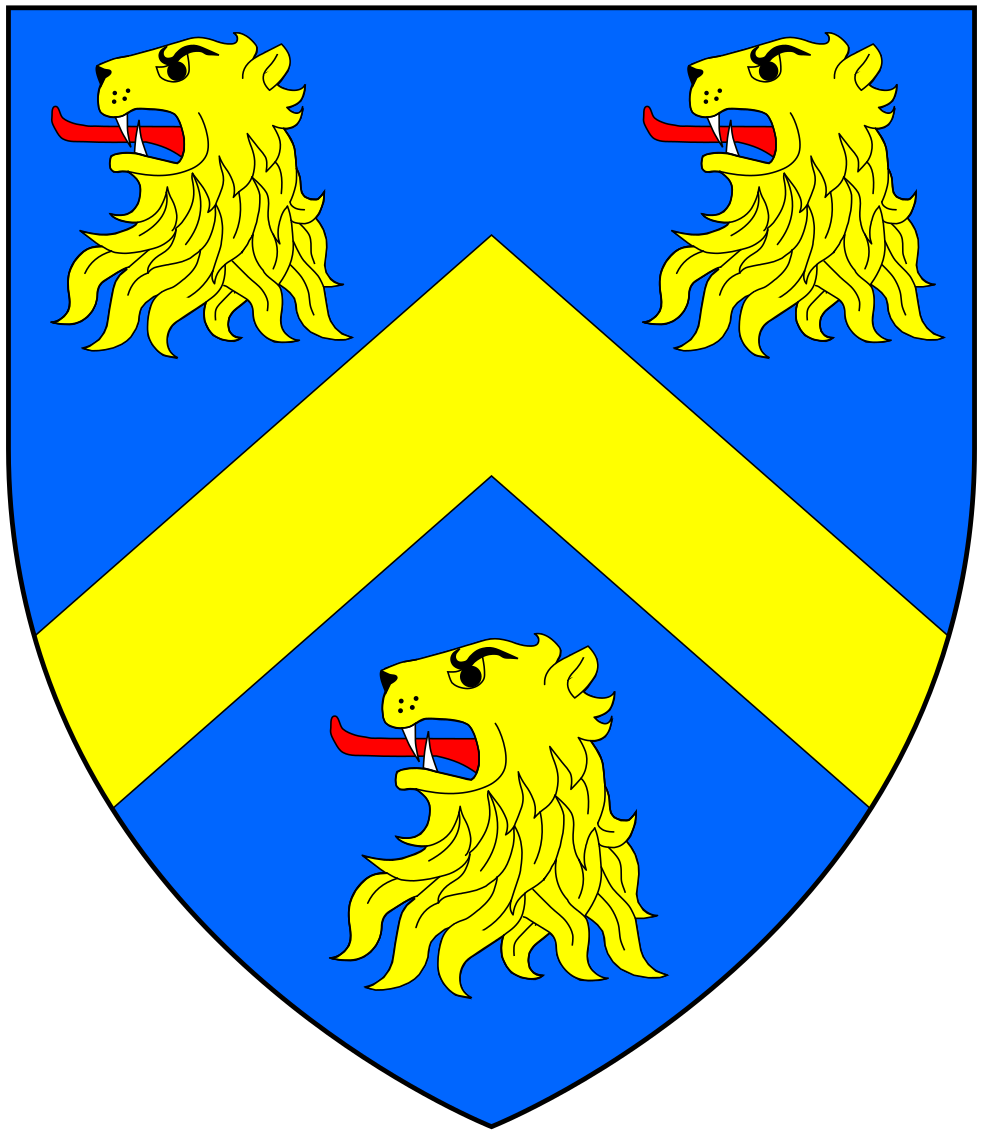
Arms of Wyndham: Azure, a chevron between three lion's heads erased or

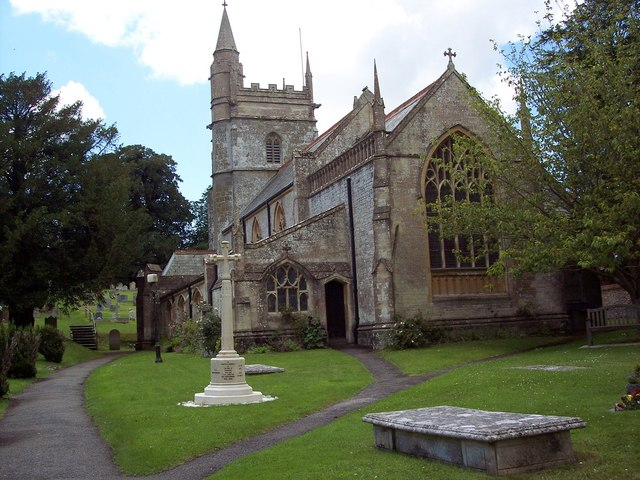
St Peter's Church, Pimperne, where the Rev Dr Thomas Wyndham was rector from 1806 until his death in 1862

== Early life and education ==
The Rev Dr Wyndham was the second son of William Wyndham of Dinton, Wiltshire, a lineal descendant of Sir John Wyndham and Sir Wadham Wyndham.

Like his namesake and first cousin Thomas Wyndham, he was educated at Sherborne and Wadham College, Oxford, the college founded by his ancestress Dorothy Wadham, thereby enabling members of the Wyndham family to claim Founders' kin. He matriculated on 12 March 1788, aged 16, obtaining his BCL in 1794 and DCL in 1809.

== Ecclesiastical career ==
Dr Wyndham's preferment greatly benefitted from the patronage of his family connections, commencing in 1801 as vicar of Compton Chamberlayne, the living of which was held by his kinsman John Penruddocke. In 1806 he was made rector of Pimperne under the patronage of his kinsman Henry Portman, which he held until his death in 1862. In 1809 Dr Wyndham also became rector of Melcombe Regis in Dorset, a favourite holiday resort of King George III, which he held until 1859.

== Steward of Sherborne ==
In 1791 The Rev Dr Wyndham was appointed Steward, along with Edward Phelips, of the Anniversary Meeting at Sherborne School. The event took place on 22 August, the celebrations comprising a series of public readings from both modern and classical poets beginning at noon, followed by an ordinary [i.e. lunch] at the Antelope Inn at three o'clock, and concluding with a ball at Sherborne Town Hall in the evening.

== Family ==
In 1809 Dr Wyndham married Anne, the eldest daughter of ardent foxhunter Walter Stubbs of Beckbury, Shropshire. They had one son, Thomas Wyndham, who in 1842 married Anne, daughter of Captain Thomas Penruddocke, thus further securing the connection between two of the West Country's leading gentry families.

Whether Dr Wyndham enjoyed fox hunting is not recorded, perhaps because at the time hunting was somewhat frowned upon in a clergyman, however by the 1820s he owned Beckbury Hall in Shropshire, and in 1837 acquired the surrounding estate and manor of Beckbury from the heirs of Sir John Astley. In 1850 he sold the Hall and 68 acres to his father-in-law Walter Stubbs, owner of the adjoining Lower Hall.
