= Peter Curgenven =

Merchant who became a slave

Peter Curgenven (1682–1729) was an East India merchant who was captured by pirates and forced to endure nine years as a galley slave.

== Background ==
Peter Curgenven, born in 1682, was the son of William Curgenven of Lelant, Cornwall. He was educated at Sherborne, under his uncle Reverend Thomas Curgenven, Headmaster of the School and afterwards Rector of Folke in Dorset.

== East Indian Merchant ==
His uncle, Thomas Curgenven, had married Dorothy Pitt, sister of Thomas Pitt the Governor of Fort St George from 1698 to 1709, and great-aunt of William Pitt, 1st Earl of Chatham. Curgenven's family connection with India enabled his advancement, and that of other members of the Curgenven family, and Peter entered the service of the East India Company in 1699 when he was seventeen years old. Five years later he became a free merchant and settled in Fort St George.

His trading was centred on the Eastern ports and purchasing indigo, saltpetre, silk, sugar, rice, and other commodities, which were sent to England by the Company. He named his ship the Sherborne, after his old school, and she was commanded by Captain Henry Cornwall.

It was on this ship when in August 1720 he set out on a trading voyage to China sailing from Surat, that he was captured by Kanhoji Angre, admiral of the Maratha Navy in 18th century India and then at war with the English at Bombay. Curgenven remained in a miserable captivity as a galley slave in fetters for about nine years. In 1729 he secured his freedom, apparently through his own industry and management, and embarked for England, but just before landing was seized with a violent cramp in his thigh, possibly as a result of being kept so long in bondage. The cramp was so severe that soon after his arrival in London his thigh was first laid open and, that failing to provide relief, was then amputated close to his body. Twelve days later the wound began to bleed profusely, as a result of which he died on 26 June 1729 aged 47.

== Family ==
Curgenven married Frances, daughter of John Rotherham, of Walthamstow, whom he left his sole executrix, having no issue. His experiences are related with a detailed inscription on a marble monument on the South wall of the Church of St Mary and St Lawrence Great Waltham in Essex erected in his memory by his widow.
