= Obadiah Wills =

English clergyman and theologian

Obadiah Wills (1625–?) was a clergyman, theologian and paedobaptist best remembered for his critiques of John Bunyan's position on baptism.

== Background ==
Obadiah Wills was the son of R Wills of Sherborne in Dorset. He was educated at Sherborne, and Exeter College, Oxford before becoming a Fellow of New College, Oxford.
