= Hugh Stanger-Leathes =

English cricketer, physician and soldier

Personal information
- Full name: Hugh Ellis Stanger-Leathes
- Born: 1 November 1878; Kensington, Middlesex, England
- Died: 4 April 1949 (aged 70); Ashford, Kent, England
- Batting: Unknown
- Bowling: Unknown

Domestic team information
- Years: Team
- 1905/06: Europeans

Career statistics
Competition	First-class
Matches	1
Runs scored	2
Batting average	2.00
100s/50s	–/–
Top score	2*
Balls bowled	84
Wickets	0
Bowling average	–
5 wickets in innings	–
10 wickets in match	–
Best bowling	–
Catches/stumpings	1/–
- Source: ESPNcricinfo, 18 November 2023

Hugh Ellis Stanger-Leathes (1 November 1878 – 4 April 1949) was an English first-class cricketer, physician and British Indian Army officer.

The son of L. Stanger-Leathes, he was born at Kensington in November 1878. He was educated at Sherborne School, where he played for the school cricket and rugby union teams. From there, he matriculated to St Bartholomew's Hospital to study medicine. He graduated in 1902, and in 1904 he joined the Indian Medical Service (IMS) as a lieutenant. In India, Stanger-Leathes made a single appearance in first-class cricket for the Europeans cricket team against the Parsees at Poona in the 1905–06 Bombay Presidency Match. In the Parsees first innings, he bowled fourteen wicketless overs for the cost of 70 runs. Batting twice in the match, he was dismissed without scoring by K. B. Mistry in the Europeans first innings, and was unbeaten on 2 following-on in their second innings, with the Parsees winning by an innings and 226 runs. In the IMS branch of the British Indian Army, he was promoted to captain in January 1907.

Stanger-Leathes served in the First World War, taking part in actions on the Western Front and Mesopotamia, for which he was mentioned in dispatches. During the war, he was promoted to major in July 1915. A further promotion to lieutenant colonel followed after the war, in July 1923. In February 1933, he was appointed honorary surgeon to George V and made a brevet colonel, prior to retiring from active service in August 1935. Stanger-Leathes died in England at Ashford on 4 April 1949. His brother was the rugby union international Christopher Stanger-Leathes.
