= Christopher Stanger-Leathes =

British Lions & England international rugby union player

- Born: Christopher Francis Stanger-Leathes; 9 May 1881 Kensington, Middlesex, England
- Died: 27 February 1966 (aged 84) Gosforth, Northumberland, England
- Occupation: Managing director

Rugby union career
- Position: Fullback
Amateur team(s)
Years	Team	Apps	(Points)
- Northumberland
–	Northern		
International career
Years	Team	Apps	(Points)
1904	British Isles	1	(0)
1905	England	1	(0)

Christopher Francis Stanger-Leathes (9 May 1881 – 27 February 1966) was an English international rugby union player.

Stanger-Leathes was born at Kensington in May 1881. He was educated at Sherborne School, where he played for the school cricket team. He played rugby union at amateur level for Northumberland and Northern. He toured Australia and New Zealand with the British Isles rugby union team in 1904, playing one Test match against Australia at Sydney. The following year he played a second Test match, this time for England against Ireland at Cork in the 1905 Home Nations Championship. Stanger-Leathes also played cricket at minor counties level for Northumberland, making 99 appearances in the Minor Counties Championship between 1903–1929. By profession he was a managing director at the ship ventilation manufacturers and sheet iron engineers Brown and Hood. He died at Gosforth in February 1966. His brother was the first-class cricketer Hugh Stanger-Leathes.
