= William Englebert =

William Englebert (died 1634), was an inventor and engineer in the reign of Queen Elizabeth I. According to Thomas Fuller, he was "an incomparable engineer", and John Norden praised him as "an excellent engineer". Elizabeth I awarded him an annual pension of one hundred marks.

== Background ==
William Englebert was the son of N Englebert (or Engleberde) of Sherborne, Dorset and educated at Sherborne School.

== Professional career ==
While information on Englebert's work is scarce, he was an innovator in fen draining and worked in Deeping Fen with Captain Thomas Lovell for which he was greatly praised by John Norden in 1618. He was a patron and mentor to fellow inventor and engineer Gabriel Plattes who dedicated two of his works to Englebert.

Frustrated by a lack of opportunity in England in his later life, he requested King James I's Privy Council for leave to serve Foreign Princes and States, being prepared to waive his pension on that condition, but he was denied license to depart.

== Background ==
It is not known whether Englebert married. In his later years he lived in Westminster, where he died in 1634.
