= Nathaniel Highmore (barrister) =

British civil servant and government barrister

Sir Nathaniel Highmore GBE KCB

Assistant Director of the War Trade Department
- In office 1915 – March 1919

Solicitor to HM Customs and Excise
- In office 1909–1913

Solicitor to HM Customs
- In office 1903–1909

Assistant Solicitor to the Board of Inland Revenue
- In office 1890–1903

Personal details
- Born: Nathaniel Joseph Highmore; 13 November 1844 Sherborne, Dorset, England
- Died: 16 April 1924 (aged 79)
- Occupation: Barrister

Sir Nathaniel Joseph Highmore (13 November 1844 – 16 April 1924) was a senior British civil servant and government barrister.

Highmore was born in Sherborne, Dorset, the son of William Highmore MP, and was educated at Sherborne School. He joined the Inland Revenue at the age of 20, was called to the Bar, and became Assistant Solicitor to the Inland Revenue in 1890. In 1903 he became Solicitor to HM Customs and in 1909 Solicitor to HM Customs and Excise. He retired in 1913.

On the outbreak of the First World War in 1914, Highmore returned to government service as the representative of the Board of Customs and Excise on the Committee on Trading with the Enemy. From 1915 to its abolition in March 1919 he was Secretary and Assistant Director of the War Trade Department.

Highmore was knighted in 1907 and appointed Knight Commander of the Order of the Bath (KCB) on his retirement in 1913. He was appointed Knight Grand Cross of the Order of the British Empire (GBE) in the 1920 civilian war honours for his services with the War Trade Department.
