= Nathaniel Highmore (surgeon) =

British surgeon (1613–1685)

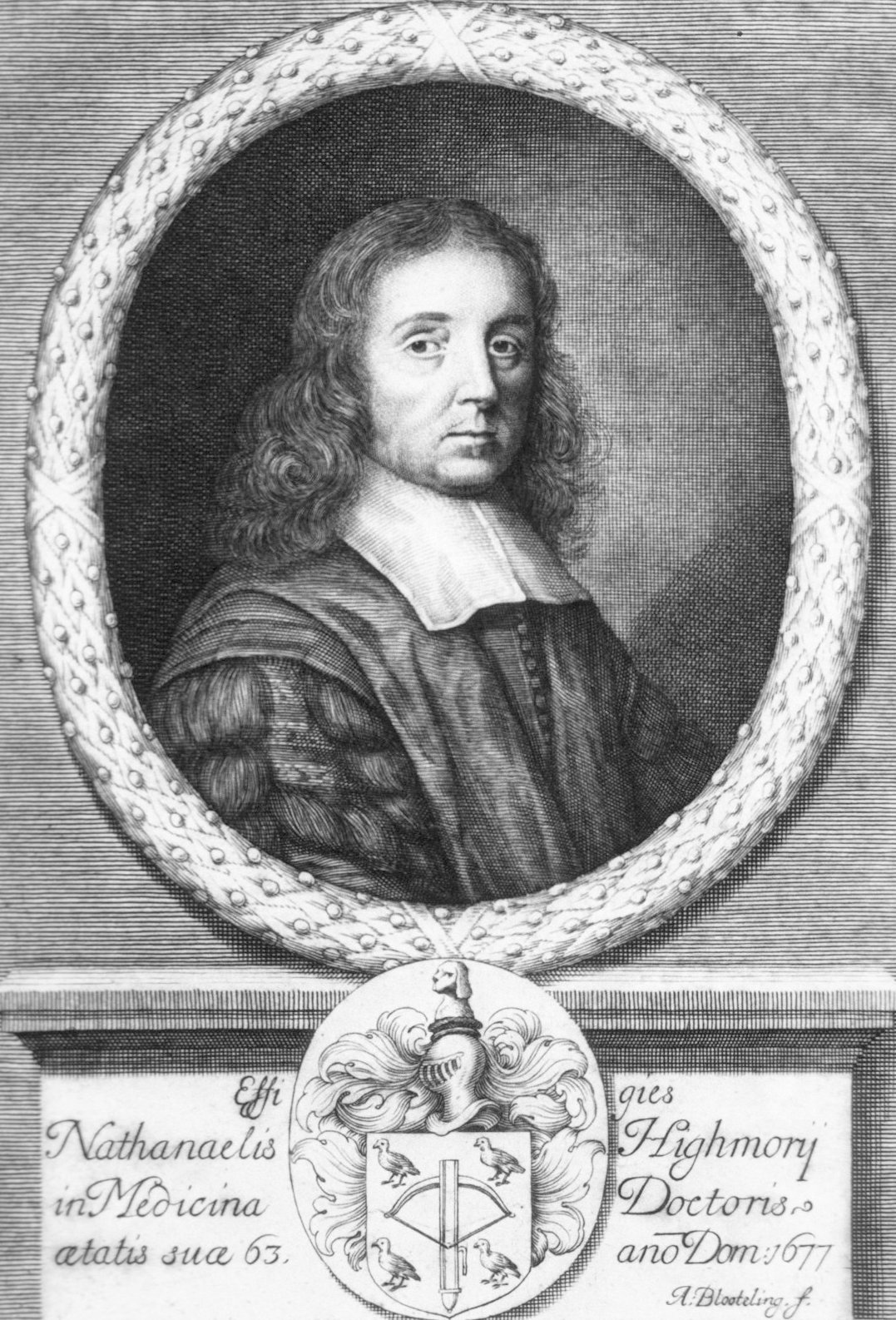
Nathaniel Highmore

Nathaniel Highmore (1613–1685) was an English surgeon.

== Education ==
He was educated at Sherborne and Queen's College, Oxford and Trinity College, Oxford.

== Professional life ==
Remembered for his anatomical studies, he published a well written treatise on human anatomy in 1651 noteworthy for its accurate and well written account of blood circulation. He is especially known for his description of the maxillary sinus, which used to be more popularly referred to as the antrum of Highmore. He is also known for describing the scrotal septum that divides the scrotum into the two sections that each house a single testicle.

Highmore is buried at Purse Caundle in Dorset, where his father had been the rector.
