= Thomas Wyndham (of Witham Friary) =

English Member of Parliament

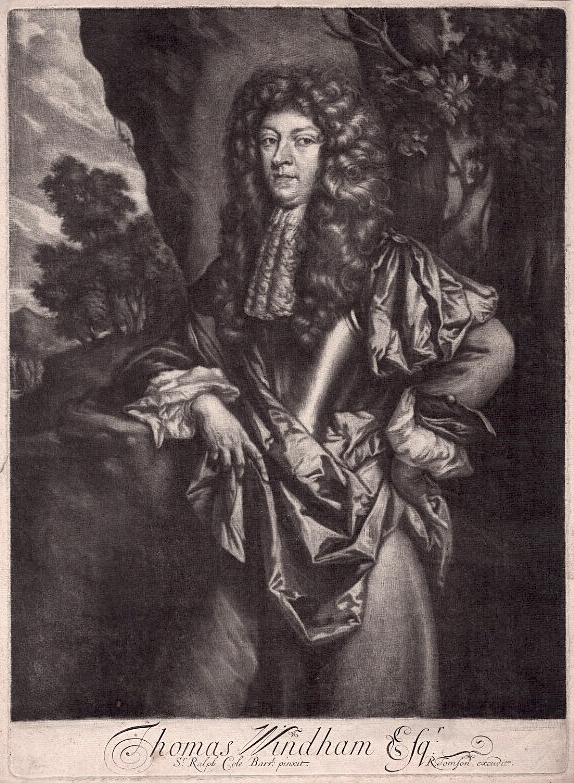
Thomas Wyndham, elected MP for Wells, Somerset in 1685 and again 1689.

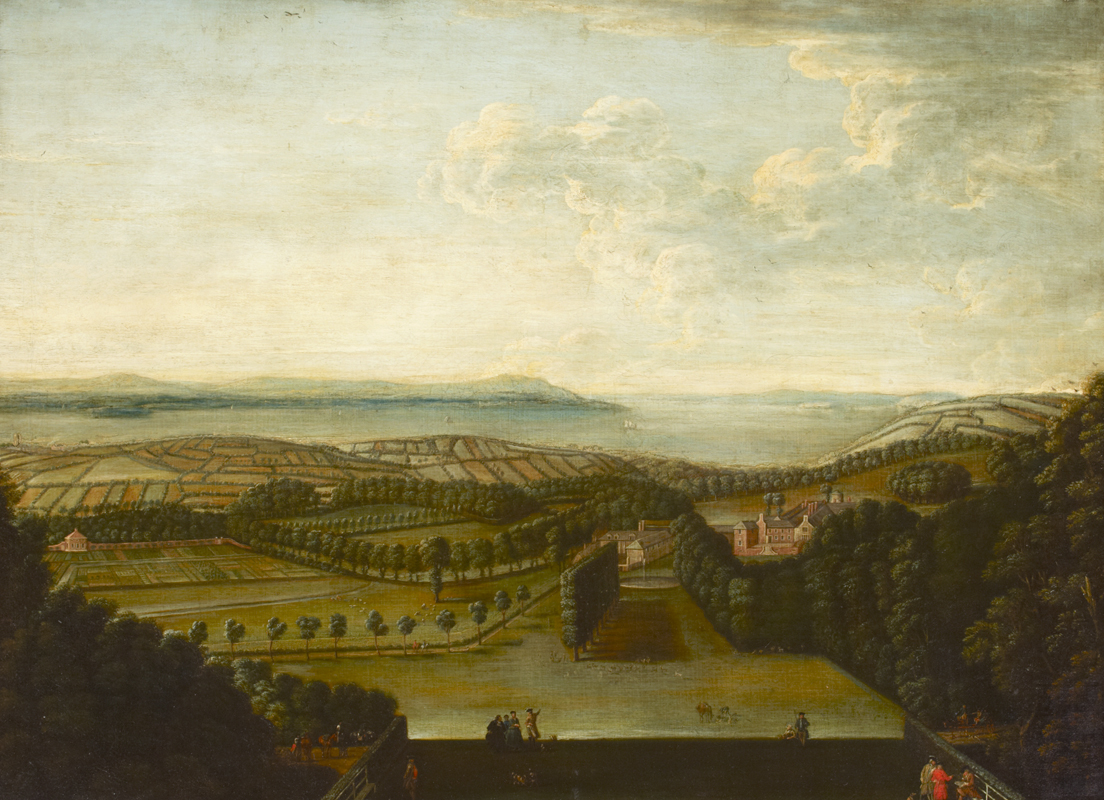
Orchard Wyndham: Thomas Wyndham's birthplace

Thomas Wyndham MP JP DL (c. 1642–1689), of Witham Friary, Somerset, was MP for Wells, Somerset in 1685 and re-elected in 1689.

== Birth and education ==
Thomas Wyndham was born at Orchard Wyndham, Somerset, the son of John Wyndham and grandson of Sir John Wyndham of Orchard Wyndham.

He was educated at Sherborne School, Middle Temple and Wadham College, Oxford. Wyndham's mother, Katherine, the daughter of Robert Hopton MP and sister of Ralph, Lord Hopton, brought him Witham Friary, the chief seat of the Hoptons, as the eldest of four coheirs.

His elder brother was Sir William Wyndham, 1st Baronet.

== Political career ==
He was commissioner for assessment for Somerset in 1673–80 and in 1689–90, JP 1676-Feb, lieutenant-colonel of the Somerset Militia by 1679 and colonel 1688, DL for Somerset 1679–87, recorder and capital burgess of Wells 1683, and commissioner for rebels’ estates, in Somerset 1686. In 1685 we was elected the MP for Wells, Somerset, and was re-elected in 1689, holding the seat until his death later that year.

== Family ==
On 2 June 1664 he married Frances, daughter of John Codrington of Codrington, Gloucestershire, and had one son, Hopton Wyndham MP (1666–1697) who successfully contested the seat of Wells at the general election of 1690, and two daughters.
