= Highmore =

Highmore is a surname. Notable people with the surname include:

- Anthony Highmore (1719–1799), English artist
- Anthony Highmore (legal writer) (1758–1829), English legal writer
- Edward Highmore (born 1961), English actor
- Freddie Highmore (born 1992), English actor
- Joseph Highmore (1692–1780), British painter
- Matthew Highmore (born 1996), Canadian ice hockey player
- Nathaniel Highmore (surgeon) (1613–1685), British surgeon
- Sir Nathaniel Highmore (barrister) (1844–1924), British civil servant and barrister
- Susanna Highmore (1690–1750), British poet
- Thomas Highmore (1660–1720), British painter

== See also ==
- Highmore, South Dakota, US
- Highmoor (disambiguation)
