= Antoine Benoist =

Antoine Benoist may refer to:

- Antoine Benoist (painter) (1632–1717), French painter and sculptor
- Antoine Benoist (engraver) (by 1721–1770), French draughtsman and engraver
- Antoine Benoist (cyclist) (born 1999), French road and cyclo-cross cyclist
