= John Tinney =

English engraver and printseller (d. 1761)

John Tinney (died 1761) was an English engraver and printseller. He carried on business at the Golden Lion in Fleet Street, London, where his own works were published. He is now known for his pupils: John Browne, Anthony Walker and William Woollett.

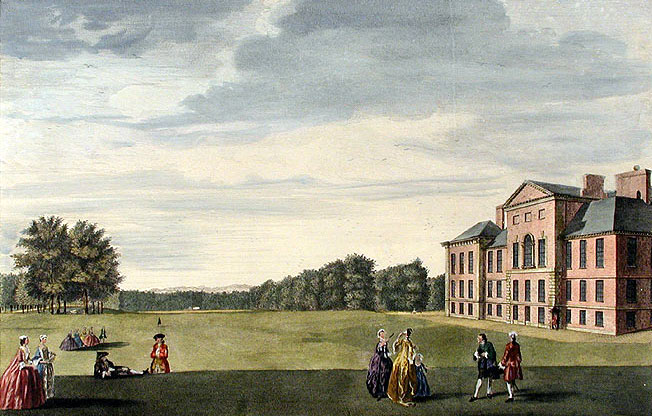
Kensington Palace after Anthony Highmore, engraving by John Tinney

== Works ==
Tinney practised both line engraving and mezzotint. His mezzotint plates included portraits of Lavinia Fenton, after John Ellys; George III, after Joseph Highmore; Chief Baron Parker; and John Wesley. He also engraved subjects after Boucher, Lancret, Rosalba, Correggio, and others. He engraved in line a set of ten views of Hampton Court and Kensington Palace, after Anthony Highmore, and some of Fontainebleau and Versailles, after Jean-Baptiste Rigaud. Some of the plates in John Ball's translation of 1729 Antiquities of Constantinople by Pierre Gilles are by him.

== Notes ==
Attribution

This article incorporates text from a publication now in the public domain: "Tinney, John". Dictionary of National Biography. London: Smith, Elder & Co. 1885–1900.
