= Highmoor =

Highmoor may refer to:

== Places ==
=== England ===
- Highmoor, Cumbria
- Highmoor, Oxfordshire
- Also High Moor, in Saddleworth

=== Northern Ireland ===
- Highmoor, County Londonderry, a townland in County Londonderry, Northern Ireland

== People ==
- Highmoor (family)

== See also ==
- Highmore
