= Susanna Highmore =

English poet (1690–1750)

Susanna Highmore (née Hiller; 1690 – 18 November 1750) was an English poet with a relatively small literary output. She was the wife of Joseph Highmore, whom she married on 28 May 1716. She was listed as "an heiress", while Joseph Highmore was a portrait painter in high demand, and the couple lived in London and associated with Isaac Watts, William Duncombe, and Samuel Richardson. They had two children, Anthony Highmore (later a painter) and Susanna (also known as a poet).

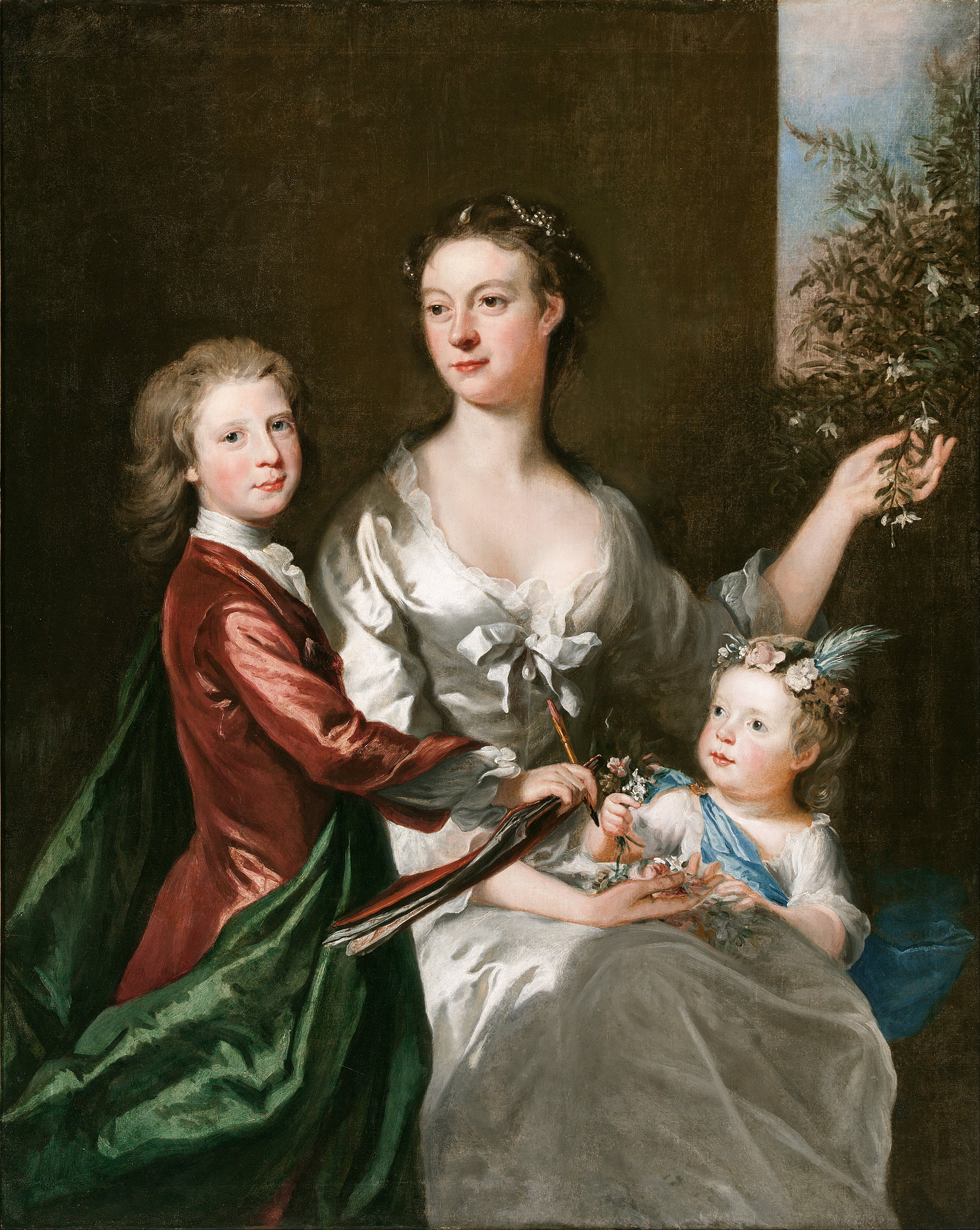
Susanna Highmore

Highmore educated her children according to the precepts of John Locke and kept them at home. Her friend Richardson said she was an indulgent but conscientious mother.

Her first publication came with an obituary for Isaac Watts, published anonymously, in 1748. In 1749, she wrote A Calvinistical Reflection for The Gentleman's Magazine. It was a satire and critique of Calvinism in highly polished verse. John Nichols later published two small poems written with great wit and polish, one being a pastiche of an Alexander Pope poem. Despite these hints at Highmore's skill, she left nothing more to the public. Her husband said that there were a great many poems that she wrote and left lying around, but he did not think to collect them nor she to publish them (her religious principles partly discouraging her from the pride of seeking attention).

She died at the age of sixty.
