= Louis Truchy =

French engraver

Louis Truchy (possibly 1731 – 1764) was a French engraver. He and Antoine Benoist were taken on by the English painter Joseph Highmore to engrave his Pamela series in 1743.
