= John Browne (artist) =

British engraver (1742–1801)

John Browne, ARA (26 April 1742 – 2 October 1801), was an English landscape engraver.

== Life ==
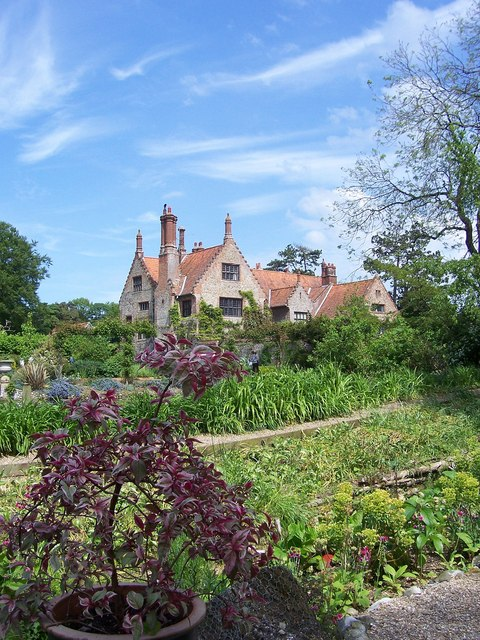
Hindringham Hall where Browne's ancestor, John Nabbes, once lived (Note: John Nabbes was one of those selected for the ill-fated order of the Knights of the Royal Oak and was also lord of Asteleys alias Nowers Manor in Hindringham.), Gentleman of Hindringham in Norfolk who died on 28 February 1665.

Born on the 26 April 1742 at Finchingfield, in Essex, the posthumous son of John Browne (Note: son of Nabbs Browne(died c. 1736), a Norwich weaver, and his wife Elizabeth Monsey. Nabbs Browne was a younger son of John Browne (died c. 1693) of Saxthorpe in Norfolk, a gentleman bearing Arms.) (1715–1741), rector of Bayfield near Holt in Norfolk and his wife Mary Pask (1720–1776), daughter of George Pask (1682–1753), vicar of Finchingfield, Essex and granddaughter of Isaac Watlington (died c. 1700), MP for Cambridge. Browne was educated at Norwich, and in 1755 was sent to London by his great-uncle, the physician Messenger Monsey (Note: Lord Cranworth was his great-grandson.), where he was placed with John Tinney the engraver.

Browne afterwards worked for William Woollett, his fellow apprentice. He quickly distinguished himself in his art, and in 1768 exhibited an engraving of "St. John Preaching in the Wilderness", after Salvator Rosa, which brought him much notice. Two years afterwards he was made an associate engraver of the Royal Academy, and he became distinguished as an excellent engraver of landscapes. Many of his works were published by Boydell. He died at Walworth in 1801. Browne's will was proved on the 29 October 1801.

Browne sat for two portraits, one when he was a boy, by William Woollett, later owned by Browne's family and the other, an exact likeness painted a few years before his death by American artist Gilbert Stuart and afterwards acquired by Misters Boydell, engraver and print-seller, John Boydell mentioned above and his nephew artist and publisher Josiah Boydell.

=== Family ===
John Browne eldest son, John Samuel Browne, Esq, late of the East India House died aged 76 on 6 June 1858 at his residence at Walworth, Surrey, Browne was himself an artist and a friend of Rev William Holwell Carr.

A granddaughter of Browne, Frances Ann Browne, and her husband Edward Miller, formerly manager of the Bank of New South Wales, were murdered on 10 November 1879 at their home in Wellington, New Zealand by one of their sons, Clarence Miller, who shortly afterwards took his own life.

=== Relatives ===
British classical scholar William Emerton Heitland (1847–1935) was a member of the same family on his mother side (Mary Heitland née Browne).

== Works ==
The following are his principal engravings:

- St. John Preaching in the Wilderness; after Salvator Rosa.
- A Landscape, with a Sportsman; after G. Poussin; in the Houghton Collection.
- A Kitchen; after Teniers.
- The Cottage; after Hobbema. 1773.
- The Waggoner; after Rubens. 1776; fine.
- A Landscape; after the same; from a picture in the collection of the Duke of Montagu.
- The Market; after the same; from a picture in the Royal Collection.
- The Milkmaid; after the same.
- Apollo and the Muses granting Longevity to the Sibyl of Cuma; after Salvator Eosa.
- Landscape, with a Waterfall; after G. Poussin.
- Landscape, with Procris and Cephalus; after Claude Lorrain.
- Landscape, with the Baptism of the Eunuch; after Jan Both.
- Morning, Evening, after Sunset, and Moonlight; from his own drawings.

== Heraldry ==
The Arms are Browne of Fulmodeston, Gules, two barrulets between three spear heads argent.
