= Leonard Cotes =

English painter

Leonard Cotes or Coates (fl. 1669–1701) was an English painter and beadle of the Worshipful Company of Painter-Stainers. His apprentices included Thomas Highmore, later Serjeant Painter to William III of England. Cotes' will is held in the UK's National Archives and was proven on 3 May 1701.
