= Pamela (paintings) =

Series of twelve paintings by Joseph Highmore

Pamela is a series of twelve paintings by the English artist Joseph Highmore, produced between 1741 and 1743 as the basis for a set of prints. They are free adaptations of scenes from the novel Pamela, or Virtue Rewarded by Samuel Richardson. They are now divided equally between the National Gallery of Victoria, the Fitzwilliam Museum and Tate Britain.

== History ==
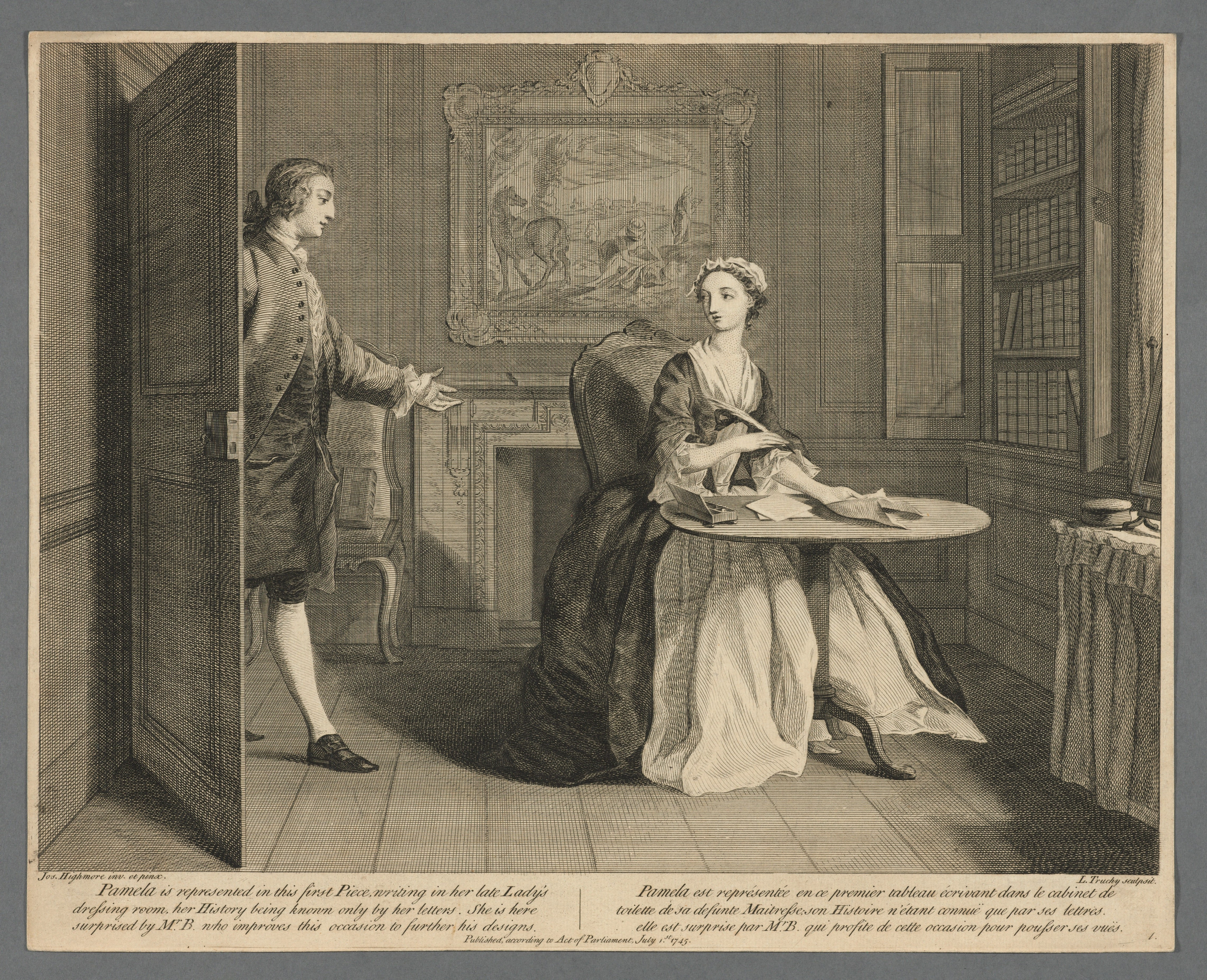
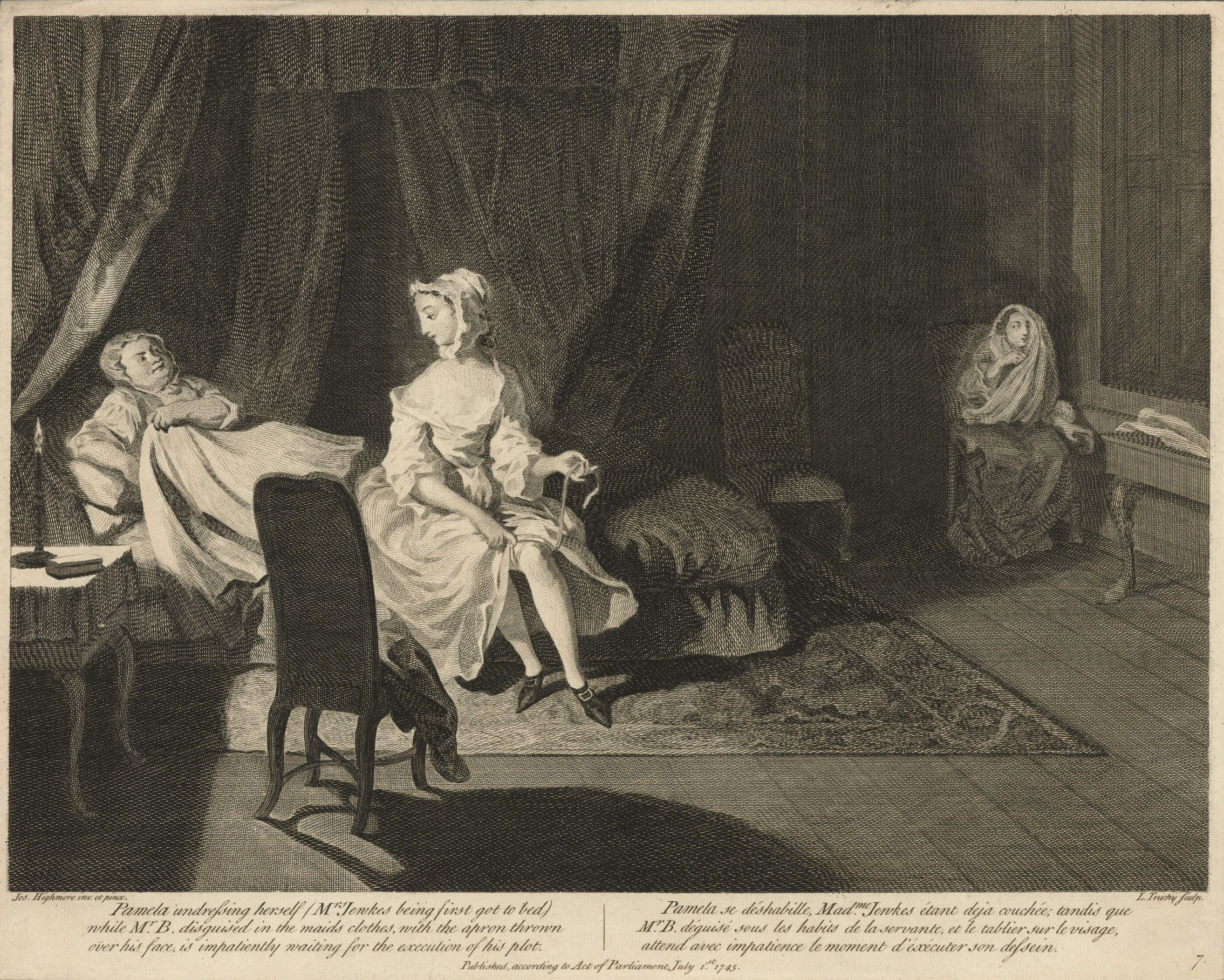
Two prints from the set of engravings after the paintings. The one on the left directly reproduces the relevant painting, whilst the one on the right is a mirror image due to the engraving process.

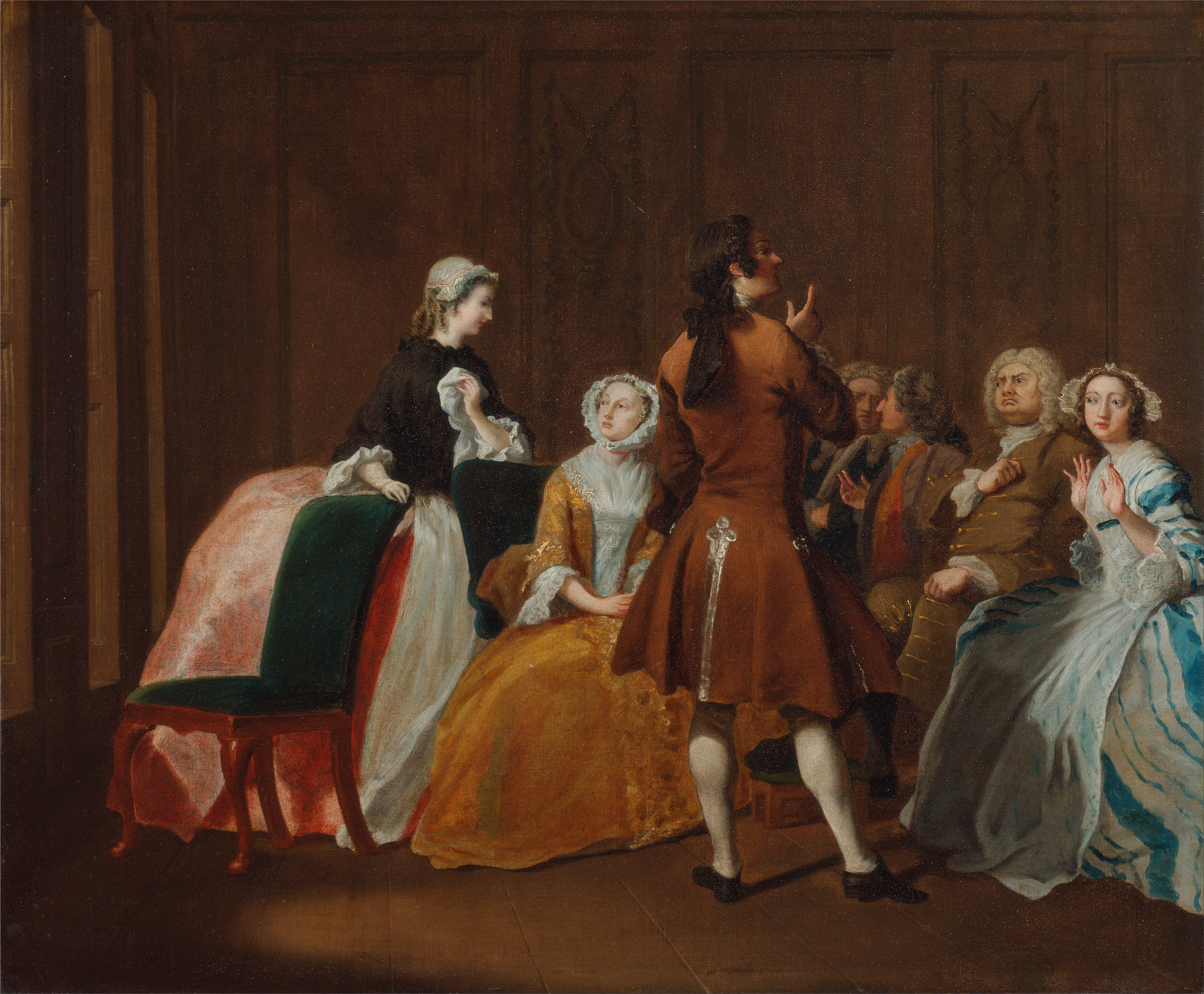
Highmore's painting of a scene from Clarissa, now in the Yale Center for British Art, 1745-47.

The book was already a popular one for painters—the younger artist Francis Hayman had produced designs for Gravelot's engravings for the 1742 edition as well as a pair of scenes from the novel for Vauxhall Gardens, also around 1742 (one is lost and the other is now in the National Trust's collections at Sizergh Castle). Highmore painted his series of twelve works between 1741 and 1743 and on 16 February 1744 advertised that ten of them were ready to be viewed at his studio, with another advertisement on 10 May announcing that all twelve paintings in the set were complete. The first advertisement also stated he was taking subscriptions for a set of twelve engravings after the novel—Highmore had Louis Truchy and Antoine Benoist produce them.

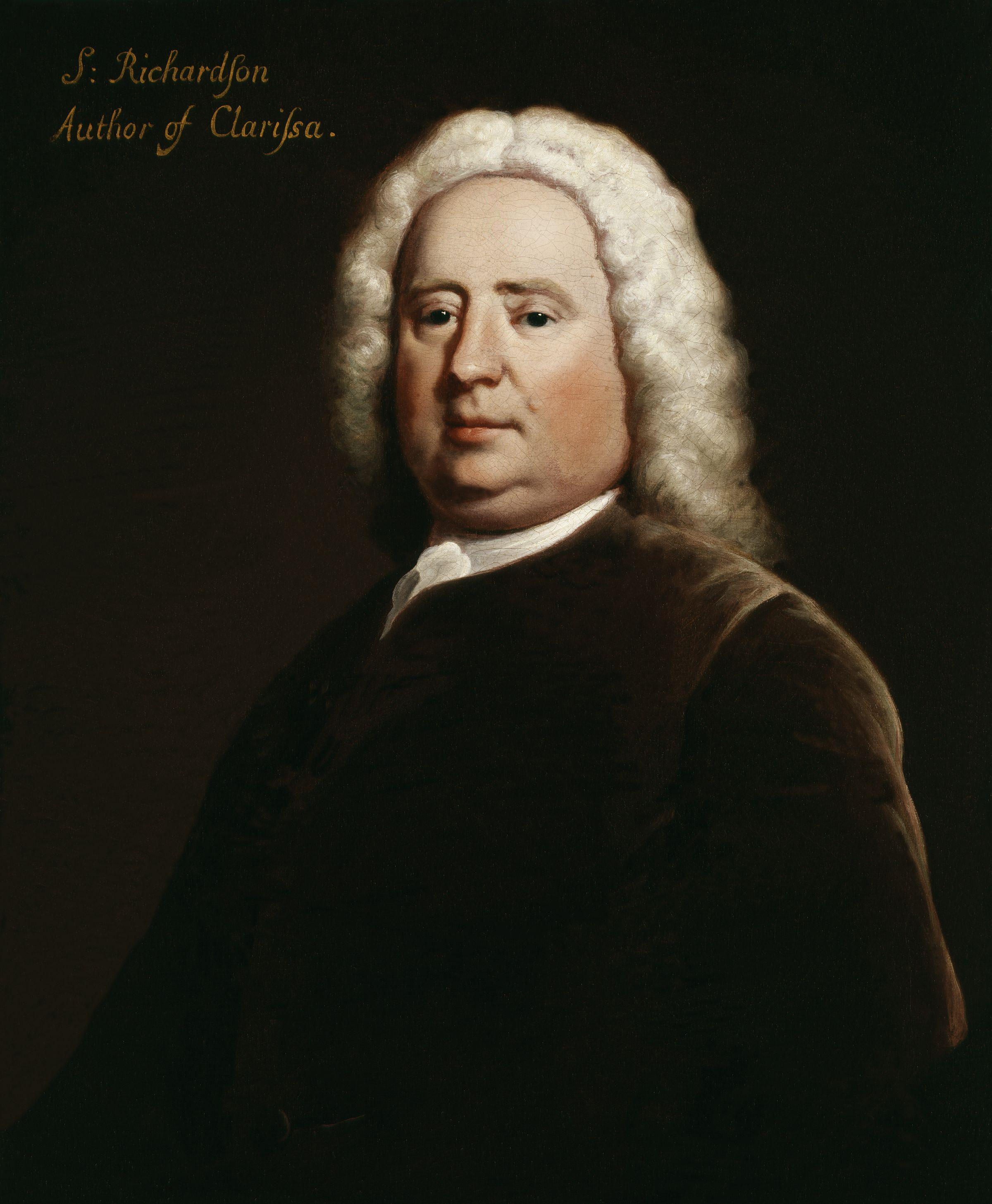
Highmore's painting of Richardson (National Portrait Gallery).

The series bears comparison with William Hogarth's contemporary series such as Marriage A-la-Mode, A Rake's Progress and A Harlot's Progress, also painted for the print market, but it differs from them in that they derive from a concrete literary source rather than the artist's plot-lines. Art historians see the Pamela series as placing Highmore alongside Hogarth and Hayman as "one of the initiators of a British school of narrative painting". Though Highmore's paintings were intended as treatments of scenes from the novel rather than strictly as illustrations, Highmore and Richardson became close friends, with the former painting the latter's portrait as well as a scene from his later novel Clarissa.

The whole series of twelve paintings was still in Highmore's studio in 1750 and when he moved to Canterbury in 1762 he sold all twelve together as a set. They then re-appeared on 26 November 1920, when they were sold from the collection of Hugh McCalmont's son Major Dermot McCalmont (1887-1968) of Cheveley Park, Cambridgeshire to a man named Peacock, who was acting on behalf of the art dealer and restorer Ayerst Horace Buttery. The National Gallery used money from the Florence Fund to buy the whole set from Buttery and then divided the twelve works equally between itself, the Fitzwilliam Museum and the National Gallery of Victoria (NGV) in Melbourne. Each of the other two institutions contributed £500, the Fitzwilliam from the Marlay Fund and the NGV from the Felton Bequest.

The NGV's interest had been piqued by the fact that some of Highmore's works were already in Australia, brought there by Highmore's grandson—in 1947 a number of those works later also ended up in the NGV, most notably his 1745-47 self-portrait. The NGV's four works from the Pamela series were first exhibited on 10 May 1921, with one local newspaper remarking that they "tell their story dramatically and, though the drawing is occasionally weak, the figures have a certain feeling of life and vitality that renders them interesting from the illustrative point of view". The four works which remained in the National Gallery were transferred from there to the National Gallery of British Art (now Tate Britain) in 1934 and the twelve works were last reunited in 1963 at Kenwood House.

== List ==
Number	Image	Title	Subject	Collection	Catalogue Entry	Notes
I		Mr B. Finds Pamela Writing	Volume I, Letter I	Tate Britain	Tate	Pamela is a poor and innocent 15-year-old maidservant whose patron and employer Mrs B. has just died, leaving her in the care of her son Mr B.. Still in the B. family home in Bedfordshire, she is writing to her father and mother when Mr B. rushes into the room and demands to see the letter. Highmore has added a picture of the Good Samaritan behind Pamela as a contrast to Mr B.'s rude and uncharitable actions.
II		Pamela and Mr B. in the summer house	Volume I, Letter XI	Fitzwilliam Museum	Fitzwilliam	Soon afterwards Mr B. finds Pamela at her needlework in a summerhouse, seizes her and kisses her against her will.
III		Pamela Preparing To Go Home	Volume I, Letter XXIX	National Gallery of Victoria	NGV	Pamela decides to flee back to her parents but refuses to take with her any of the clothes Mr B. has given her since they would be "the price of my shame". Mr B. hides in a closet and hears the conversation, whilst to the left is the sympathetic but humorous housekeeper Mrs Jervis.
IV		Pamela Leaves Mr B's House in Bedfordshire	Volume I, Letter XXXII	Fitzwilliam Museum	Fitzwilliam	Misnumbered 'No 5' on its frame, when it is the fourth scene in the order they appear in the novel. Mr B. agrees to send Pamela back to her parents in his coach but instead secretly instructs the coachman to abduct her and take her to his estate in Lincolnshire. The B. family crest is on the side of the coach, contrasting their noble pedigree with Mr B.'s ignoble actions. He appears at an upstairs window, whilst Mrs Jervis weeps at Pamela's departure in an arch below.
V		Pamela shows Mr Williams a hiding place for their letters	Volume I, Letter XXXII	Fitzwilliam Museum	Fitzwilliam	Misnumbered 'No 6' on its frame, when it is the fifth scene in the order in which they appear in the novel. Mr B. has concocted a cover story that he intends to marry Pamela to Mr Williams, his chaplain in Lincolnshire. Instead Mr Williams is sympathetic to Pamela's plight and agrees to communicate secretly with her via a dead drop under a sunflower in the garden. He later proposes marriage to her in an attempt to save her from Mr B. but soon afterwards is assaulted by thugs and arrested at Mr B.'s instigation. In the background is Mr B.'s Lincolnshire housekeeper Mrs Jewkes, who is rude to Pamela and party to Mr B.'s schemes.
VI		Pamela in the Bedroom with Mrs Jewkes and Mr B.	Volume I, Letter XXXII	Tate Britain	Tate	Misnumbered VII in the Tate catalogue, when it is the sixth scene in the order in which they appear in the novel. Mrs. Jewkes has forced Pamela to share a bed with her. In the left background is Mr B., who in a few moments will get into bed disguised as his own housemaid Nan and attempt to rape Pamela.
VII		Pamela Fainting	Volume I, Letter XXXII	National Gallery of Victoria	NGV	"With struggling, fright, terror" at the rape attempt, Pamela faints and Mr B. and Mrs Jewkes think she is dying. Mr B. begins to repent of his previous bad behaviour.
VIII		Pamela Greets Her Father	Page 145 (1816 edition)	National Gallery of Victoria	NGV	Mr B. becomes determined to win and marry Pamela legitimately and so summons her father without her knowledge to assure him of his honourable intentions towards her. Pamela hears her father's voice as she comes downstairs and rushes into the room, knocking over a table as she throws herself at his feet. To the right the rest of the company express their surprise and confusion, whilst on the wall are paintings of Mr B.'s ancestors.
IX		Pamela is Married	Page 177 (1816 edition)	Tate Britain	Tate	Mr B. realises his family will disapprove of his marriage and so holds it in secret at his chapel in Lincolnshire, witnessed by Mrs Jewkes and Mr Peters, the vicar of the parish. The service is taken by Mr Williams and Nan keeps watch at the door.
X		Pamela and Lady Davers	Page 206 (1816 edition)	National Gallery of Victoria	NGV	Still not knowing of the secret marriage, Mr B.'s sister Lady Davers accuses Pamela of becoming Mr B.'s mistress, but Pamela starts up and replies "I must tell your ladyship, I scorn your words and am as much married as your ladyship!". To the right, Mrs Jewkes and Nan have heard the commotion and rush in through the door. Soon afterwards Lady Davers ejects the servants and locks the door, but Pamela manages to escape through the open window (background) to a waiting coach.
XI		Pamela Asks Sir Jacob Swinford’s Blessing	Page 388 (1816 edition)	Tate Britain	Tate	Whilst Pamela's virtues quickly win over the rest of Mr B.'s snobbish relations, his uncle Sir Jacob Swinsford continues to obstinately oppose the marriage, especially since Sir Jacob's children will inherit the estate if Mr B. remains childless. Pamela initially pretends to be Jenny, the youngest daughter of Lady C., and Sir Jacob states that he wishes Mr B. had married such a "charming creature" instead of a maidservant. Initially aghast when the ruse is revealed, he soon gives in, asks her forgiveness and blesses the marriage.
XII		Pamela Tells a Nursery Tale / Pamela Teaching Her Children	n/a	Fitzwilliam Museum	Fitzwilliam	In a scene of Highmore's own creation, Pamela is now the mother of a large brood of children, including a son and heir for Mr B.. She has taken on their education herself and a painting of children or cherubs on the wall underlines the theme.
