= Antoine Benoist (engraver) =

French draughtsman and engraver

Antoine Benoist (by 1721–1770) was a French draughtsman and engraver, who spent much of his working life in London, and was known as Anthony Benoist.

== Life ==
He was born at Tracy-le-Mont in Picardy, the son of the artist Jean-Isaac Benoist. The date of birth 1721 traditionally given is questioned and considered probably too late in the Oxford Dictionary of National Biography. Some drawings he did of sculpture in Notre-Dame de Paris have been dated to the later 1720s. They survived in engravings by Bernard de Montfaucon. He also drew sculpture at the Basilica of Saint-Denis.

By 1735 Benoist was brought to England by the engraver Claude du Bosc. He found other employment as a teacher of drawing in wealthy families.

During the War of the Austrian Succession, and at least between 1744 and 1747, Benoist was working in Paris. He died in London in August 1770.

== Works ==
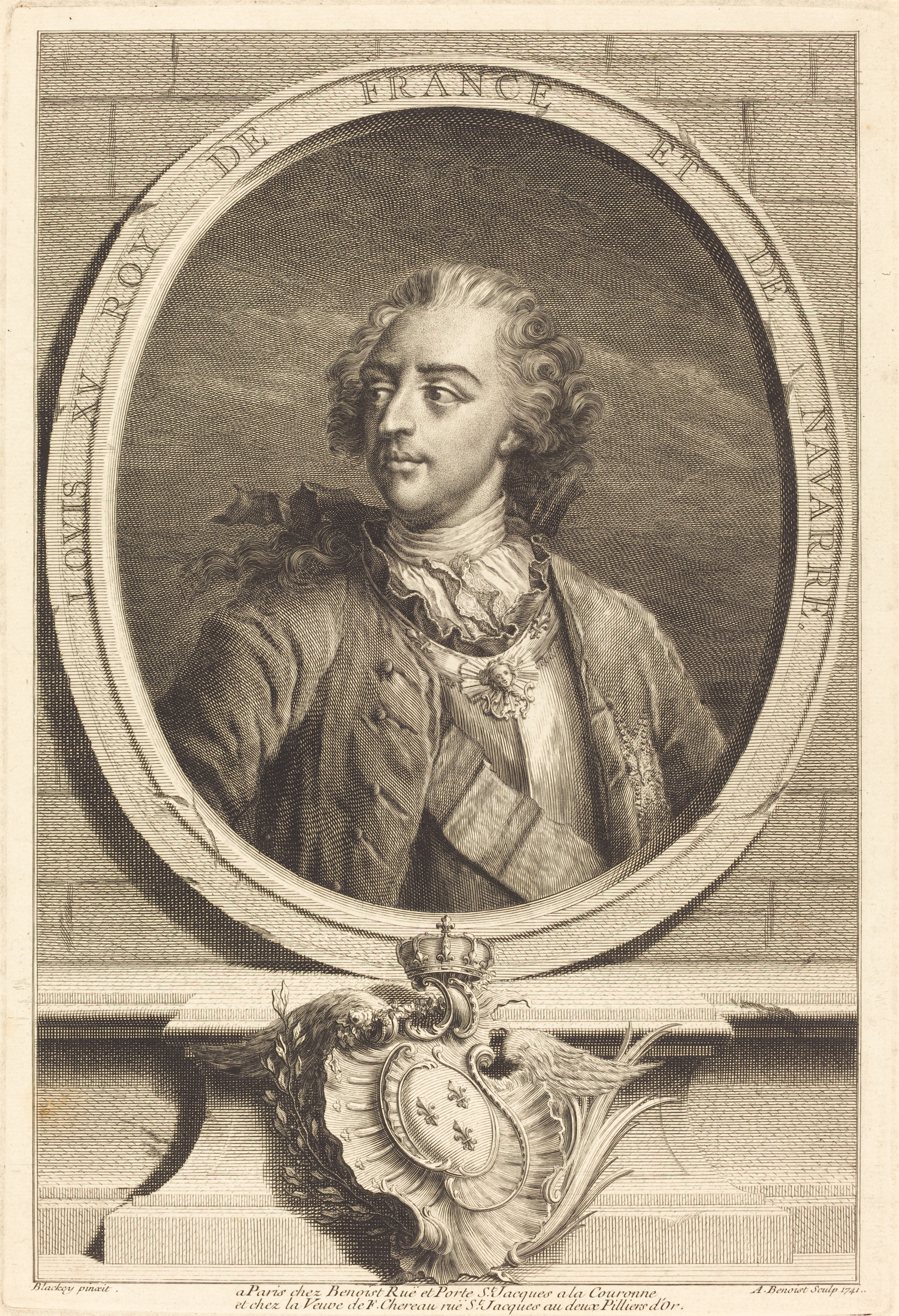
Antoine Benoist, 1741 engraving of King Louis XV

Among Benoist's engravings are a portrait of Louis XV, after Nicholas Blakey, dated 1741. He took on work of all kinds, and engraved a map of Kew Gardens as Plan of the royal gardens of Richmond, c. 1750.

Benoist was the first to engrave a cricket match. That work was part of a set of designs produced by Francis Hayman, for Vauxhall Gardens, and was published in 1743. That year he engraved a Peak District view for Thomas Smith of Derby, of Dovedale, in a collection later reprinted by John Boydell.

In the 1740s Benoist with Louis Truchy produced the engravings of the Pamela series of 12 paintings by Joseph Highmore.

In later life Benoist engraved works of Dominic Serres related to scenes of the Seven Years' War, such as the Capture of Belle Île and the Siege of Quebec, with war damage to the cathedral in the city (which Serres had not visited).

=== "Mock Masons" frieze ===
Benoist made a frieze on two plates representing The Grand Procession of the Scald Miserable Masons, dated 1742, and recording a mocking event on 27 April (O.S.) taking off a Masonic parade held on the same date. Its full length is nearly 4 feet (1.2 m).

Vic Gatrell considers that this work documents what was effectively the last gasp of the rough music tradition of London, through disrespectful spectacles in which "men on donkeys blew cowhorns and banged drums":

Its ambition is commemorated in what is one of the largest of all eighteenth-century topographical engravings.

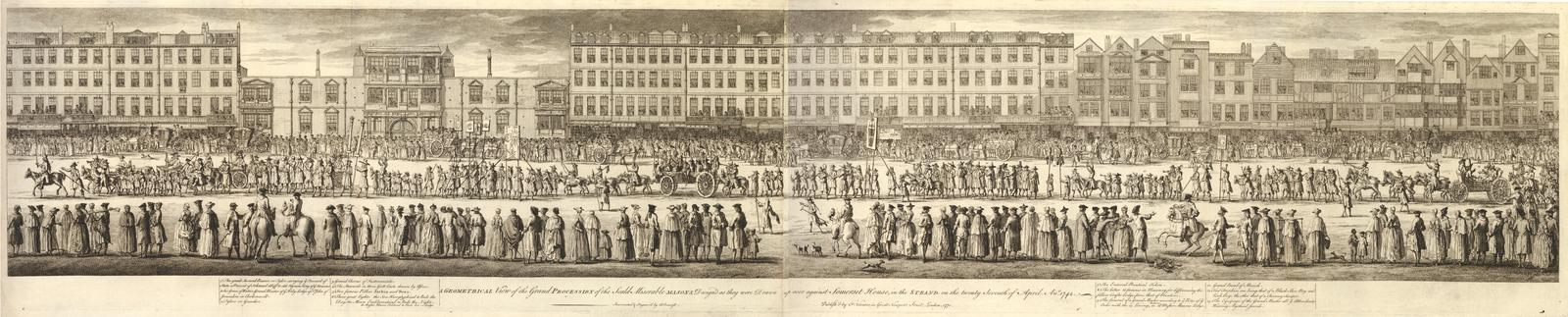

William Hone wrote about it in his Every-day Book, first published 1825–6. Albert Mackey dates this satirical pageant to 1741, with a first event in March followed by a fuller procession on 27 April. He states that the actual annual Masonic procession it was aimed at was discontinued, but in 1757. The organisers of the "Mock Masons" were Paul Whitehead and Esquire Carey, surgeon to Frederick, Prince of Wales. There is a detailed description of the procession in a British Museum catalogue of 1877. Hone's account has an engraving after a 1741 engraving of a mock procession, that design being tentatively attributed to Whitehead based on comments of his biographer Edward Thompson.

=== Attributed works ===
There is another engraver named Benoist of the period, leading to problems of attribution. They involve C. L. Benoist, born in Paris, who came to London with Claude du Bosc in 1712.

Some engravings for Frederick, Prince of Wales, views of Malta reproducing works by Joseph Goupy, may have been by Antoine or by C. L. Benoist. The British Museum credits Antoine, as does the Cleveland Museum of Art. Some etchings of the battles and sieges of the French armies in the reign of Louis XIV are again attributed to these two engravers. Antoine engraved such works, while he was in Paris in the 1740s. According to the Benezit Dictionary of Artists, C. L. Benoist engraved sporting scenes of his design, and at some point returned to Paris.
