= Thomas Highmore =

English painter

Thomas Highmore (22 June 1660 – 8 March 1720) was an English painter of the late 17th and early 18th centuries. He was one of two sons born to Abraham Highmore, making him cousin to the surgeon Nathaniel Highmore. He was born and died in London. His apprenticeship to Leonard Cotes (1674–1681) just predated the Glorious Revolution, which put William III and Mary on the British throne. William appointed Highmore his Serjeant Painter in April 1703 and his successor in that role was his relation and apprentice James Thornhill. His nephew Joseph Highmore also later became a painter, though Joseph never studied under Thomas
