= Joseph Highmore =

English painter (1692–1780)

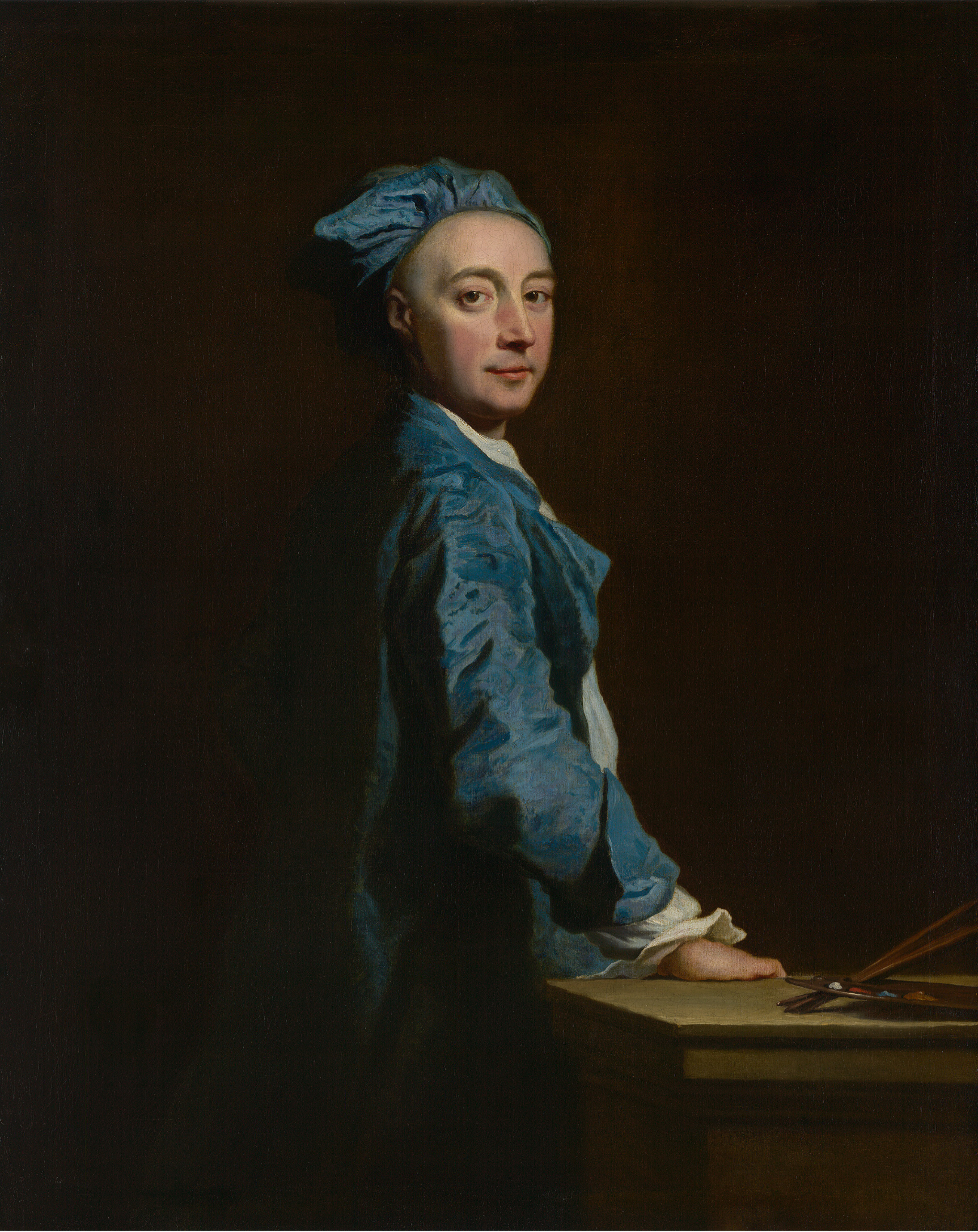
- Self-portrait, c. 1746
- Born: 13 June 1692; London, England
- Died: 3 March 1780 (aged 87); Canterbury, Kent, England
- Known for: Painting
- Spouse: Susanna Hiller (m. 1716)

Joseph Highmore (13 June 1692 – 3 March 1780) was an English painter of portraits, conversation pieces and history subjects, illustrator and writer. After retiring from his career as a painter at the age of 70, he published art historical and critical articles.

== Life ==
Highmore was born on 13 June 1692, in London, the third son of Edward Highmore, a coal merchant, and nephew of Thomas Highmore, Serjeant Painter to William III. He displayed early his ability in art but was discouraged by his family from taking up art professionally, and began a legal training instead. At the ending of a clerkship at the age of 17 (during which he continued to attend a drawing academy run by Godfrey Kneller and lectures on anatomy by William Cheselden), he abandoned his law career and started to work as a portrait painter in London. From 1720, he attended the St Martin's Lane Academy, where he was exposed to contemporary French art.

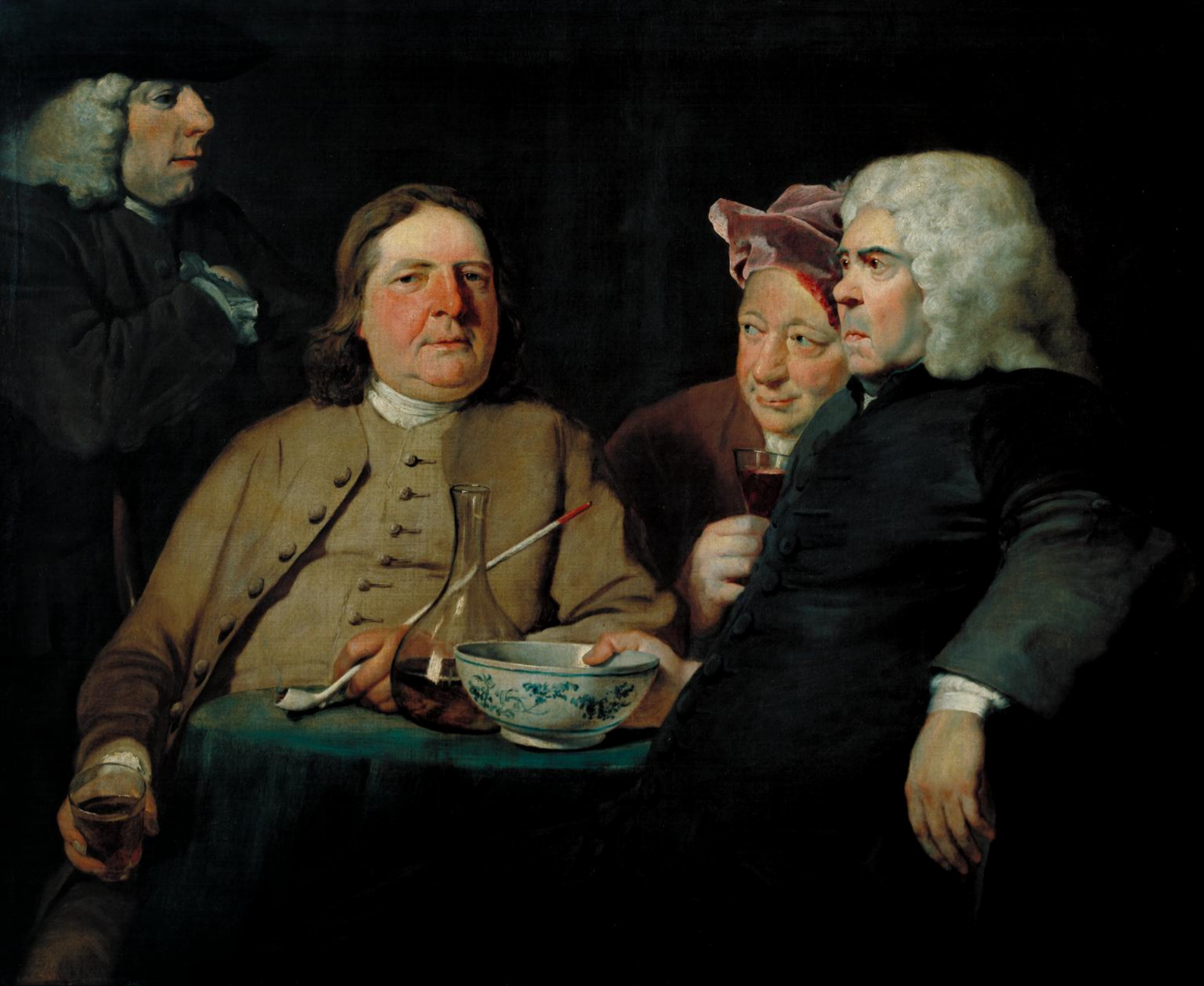
Mr Oldham and his Guests

On the revival of the Order of the Bath in 1725, he was selected to paint the knights in full costume. In 1732, he visited the Low Countries to study Rubens and van Dyck's works. Two years later he visited Paris where he studied works in public and private collections. In the next few years he received patronage from the royal family, but during the 1740s he began to cater more to middle-class clients who appreciated his ability to capture a likeness in a single sitting and to create an informal composition. In 1762, Highmore sold the contents of his studio and retired to Canterbury, where he lived with his daughter and son-in-law. He subsequently published art historical and critical articles, including on Rubens' ceiling decorations in the Banqueting House, Whitehall, London, colour theory and Brook Taylor's theory of perspective.

Highmore died on 3 March 1780, aged 87, in Canterbury. He was buried in sheep's wool (to comply with a 17th-century statute to encourage the wool trade) in the fifth bay of the south aisle of Canterbury Cathedral.

His wife Susanna Highmore (née Hiller) was a poet, though little of her work was published. His son Anthony Highmore (1719–99) was an artist, one of whose 15 children, Anthony Highmore Jnr. (1758–1829), became a writer on legal affairs and a social activist.

Joseph Highmore: 1692:1780 volumes I and II a PhD dissertation, 1975, by Alison Shepherd Lewis is at Harvard University, Fogg Museum, stack number HU 90 10796B

== Work ==
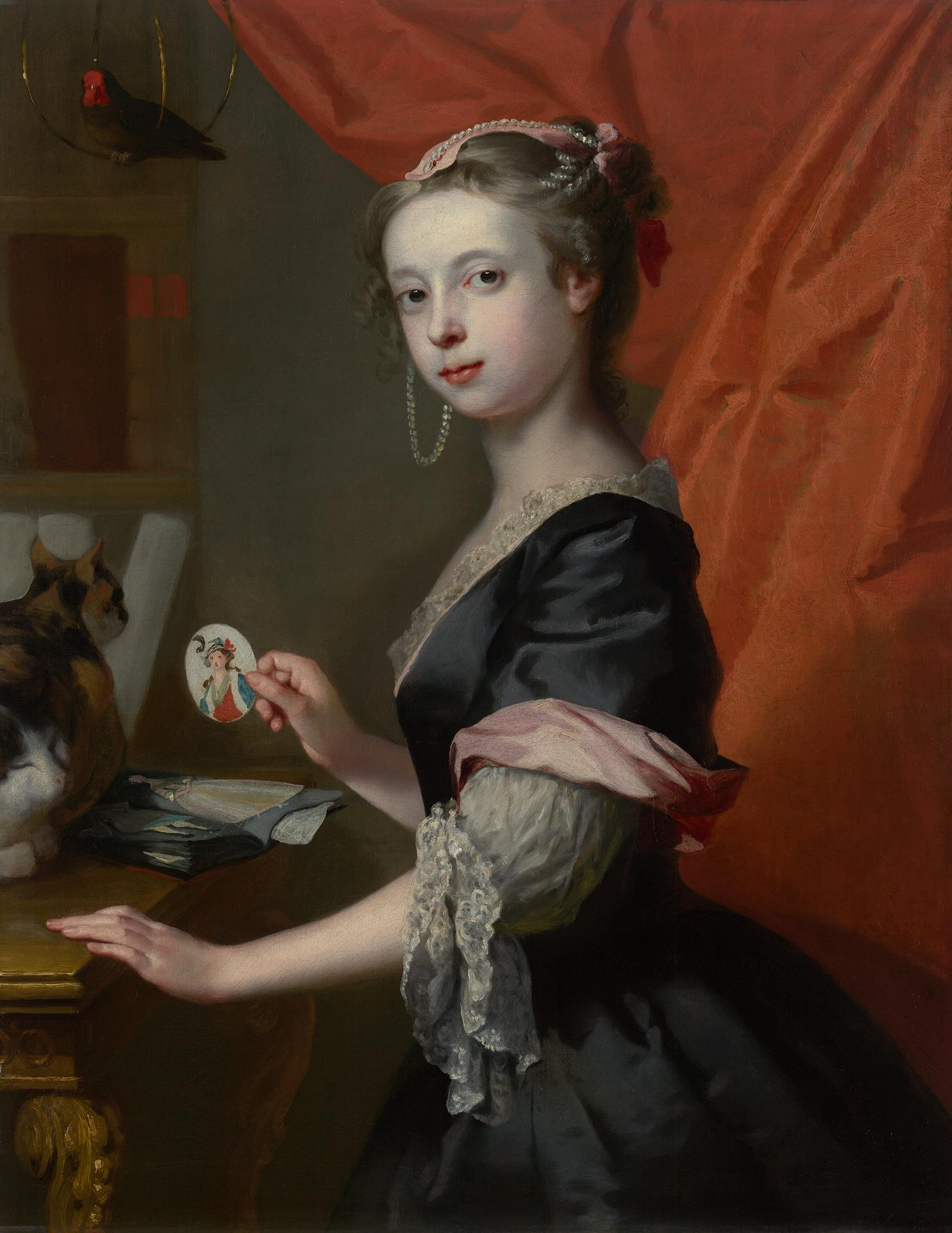
Portrait of Susanna Highmore

He painted portraits, conversation pieces and history subjects. He worked for artistocratic clients as well as middle-class patrons. His ability to give a group portrait the informal outlook of a conversation piece is demonstrated in his Mr Oldham and his Guests (National Gallery, London). It shows Mr Oldham, who appears to have just arrived, standing at the extreme left of the painting, with his arms folded over the top of a chair. He is looking with an expression of barely concealed amusement at his guests who are already seated at a table. Highmore also made portraits of his children. His portrait of his daughter Susanna (c.1740, National Gallery of Victoria) is remarkable in the richness of the visual details and the confident glance which the sitter casts towards the viewer. For his portraits, he employed the specialist drapery painter Joseph Van Aken to paint the dresses and costumes of his sitters.

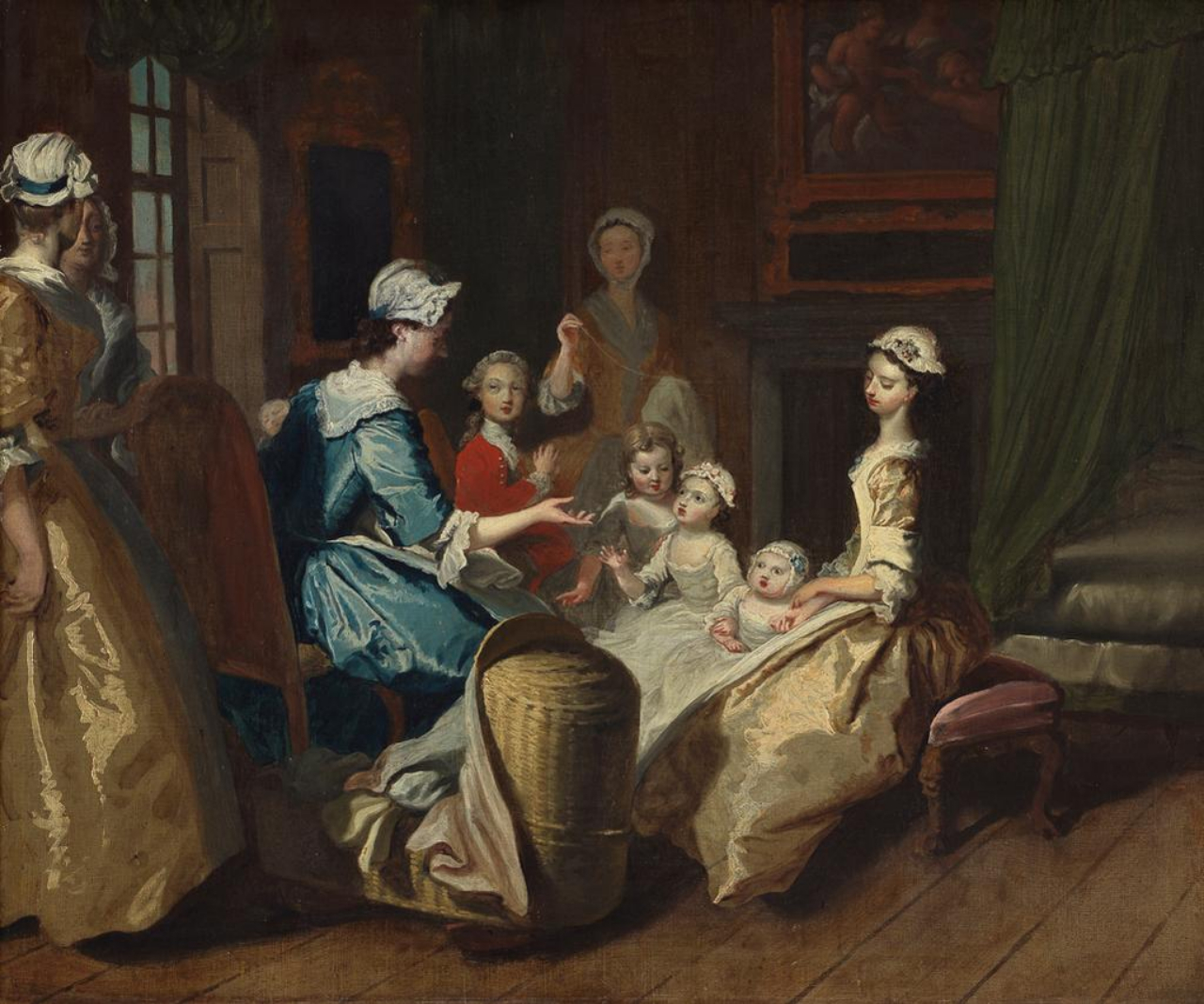
Pamela Tells a Nursery Tale from the "Pamela" series

Highmore painted works illustrating biblical subjects, historical painting being a genre which Highmore had studied during his visit to Paris. One such biblical painting is Hagar and Ishmael, which Highmore donated to the Foundling Hospital for the purpose of decorating its Court Room. The painting is now part of the Foundling Hospital art collection at The Foundling Museum in London. During the 1740s, Highmore had become connected with the new Foundling Hospital which aimed to support desperate and abused women. His involvement caused him to engage with issues relating to women's vulnerability to sexual assault and society's unwillingness to support them. He expressed this engagement in his work The Angel of Mercy (c. 1746, Yale Center for British Art). It depicts a desperate mother about to kill her baby, when her hand is stayed by an angel who points to the Foundling Hospital shown in the background as the alternative to the murder of her child.

In 1744, Highmore painted a series of 12 paintings after scenes from Samuel Richardson's epistolary novel Pamela, or Virtue Rewarded. The novel was first published in 1740–1 and recounts the virtuous lady's maid Pamela Andrews' relationship with an aristocratic seducer whom she repeatedly rebuffs, then reforms and finally marries. Highmore's paintings were based on the novel Pamela but were not conceived as book illustrations, although they were later engraved by Antoine Benoist and Louis Truchy. They were rather an attempt to recount the whole story in successive and connected images. Highmore's pictures were conversation pieces which focused on the characters.

As an author, he was best known for the works Critical Examination of Reubens' two Paintings in the Banqueting House and Observations on Bodwell's Pamphlet against Christianity.

== Gallery ==
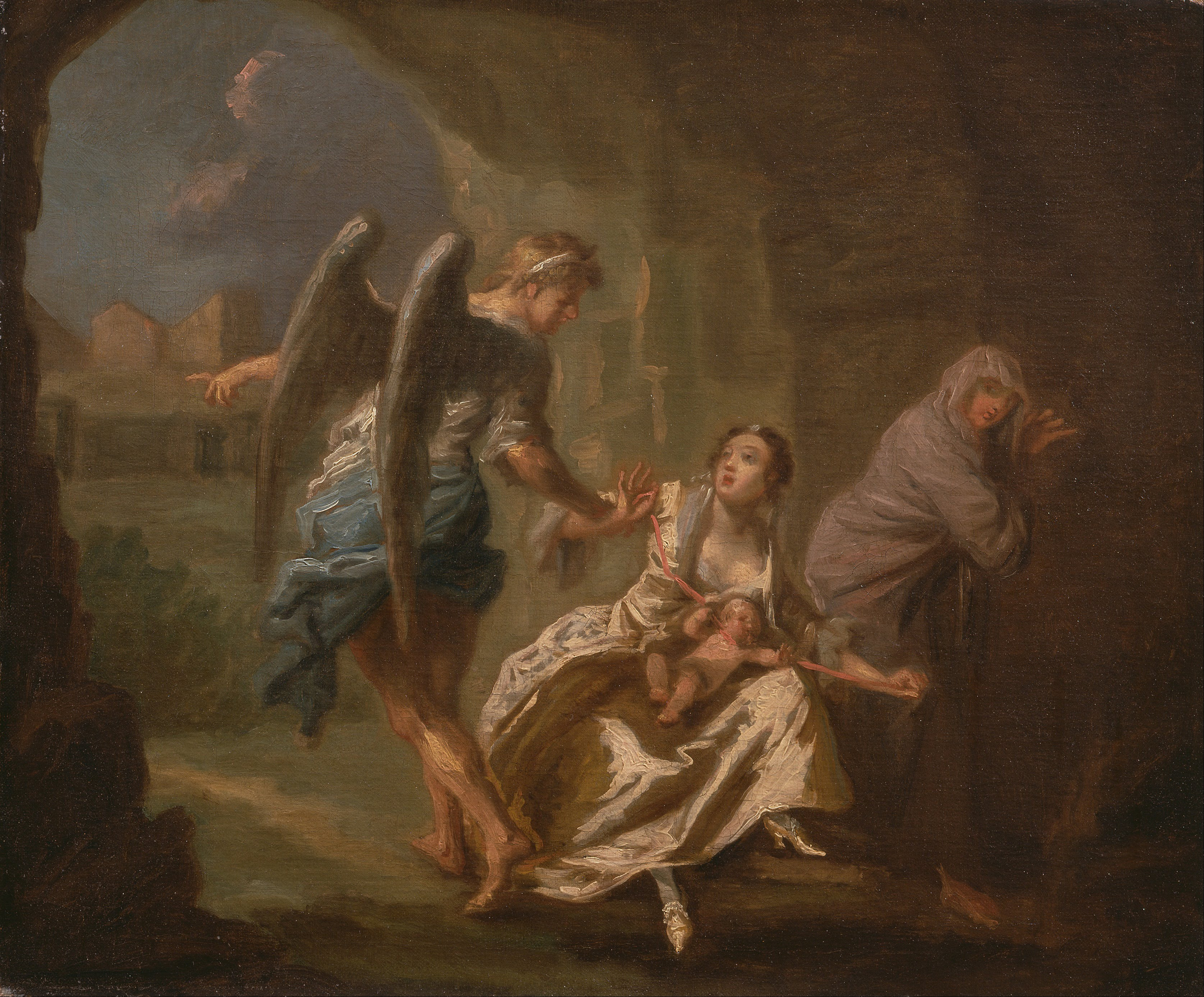
The Angel of Mercy, 1746

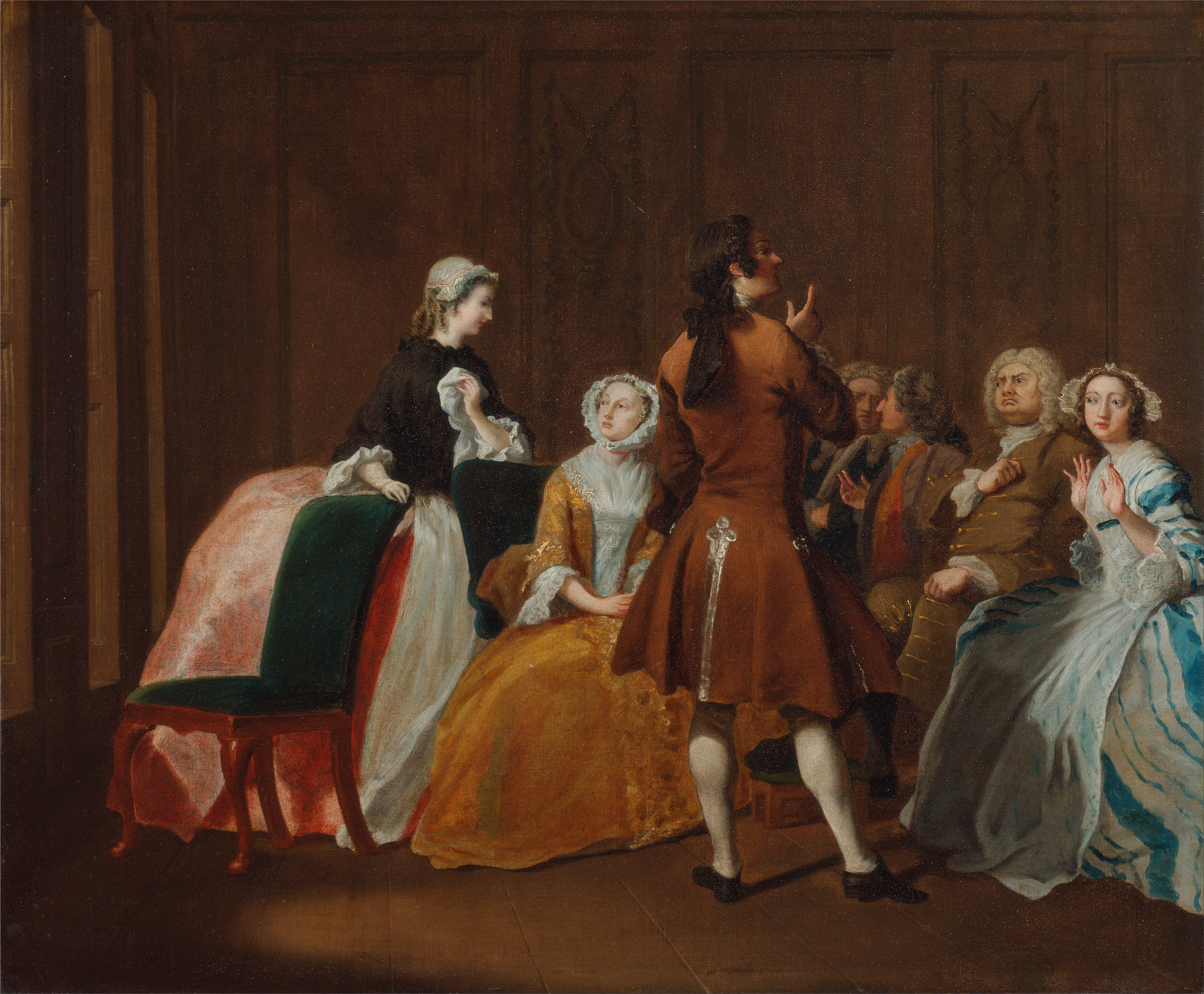
The Harlowe Family, from Samuel Richardson's "Clarissa", 1745/1747

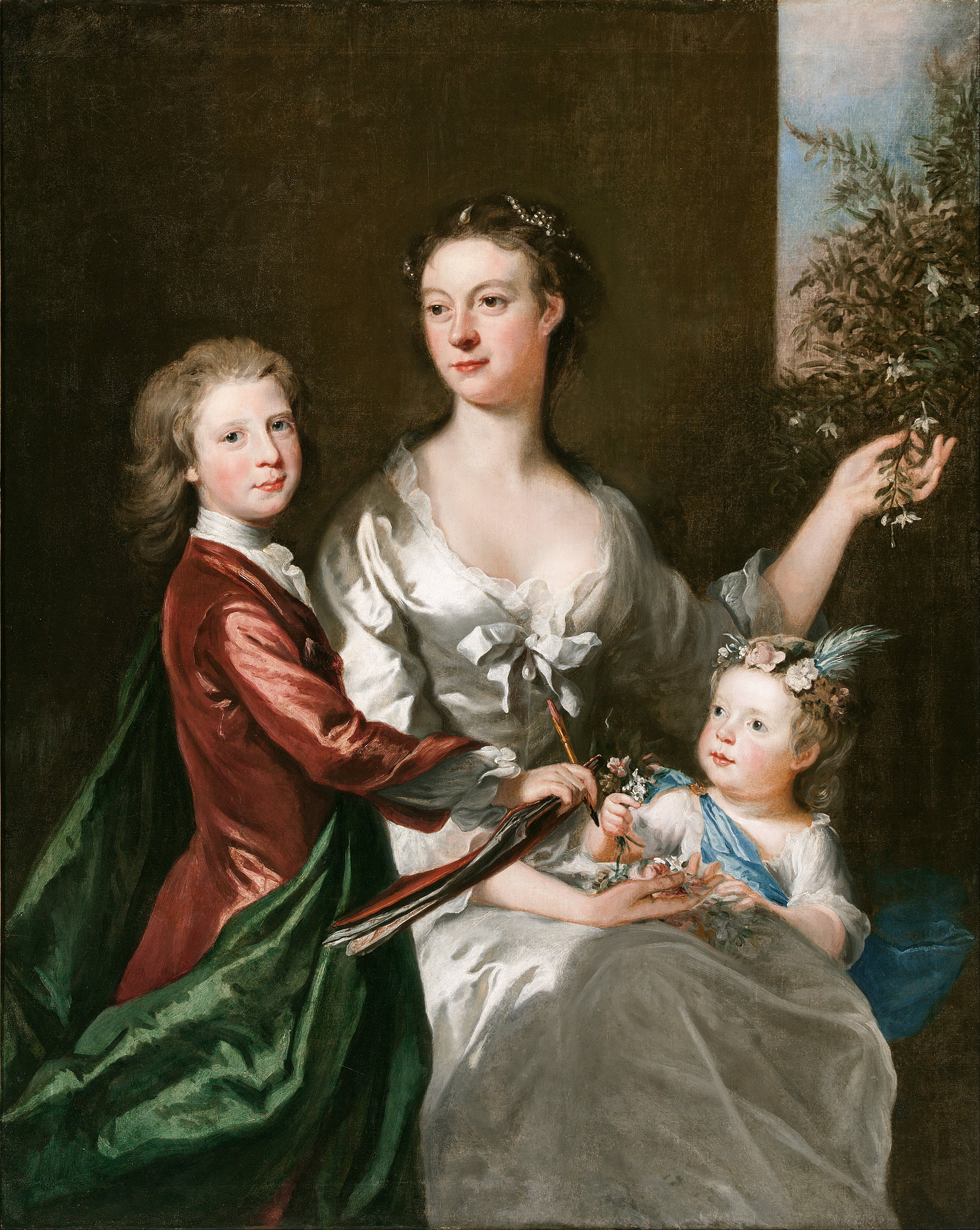
The artist's wife Susanna, son Anthony and daughter Susanna, 1728

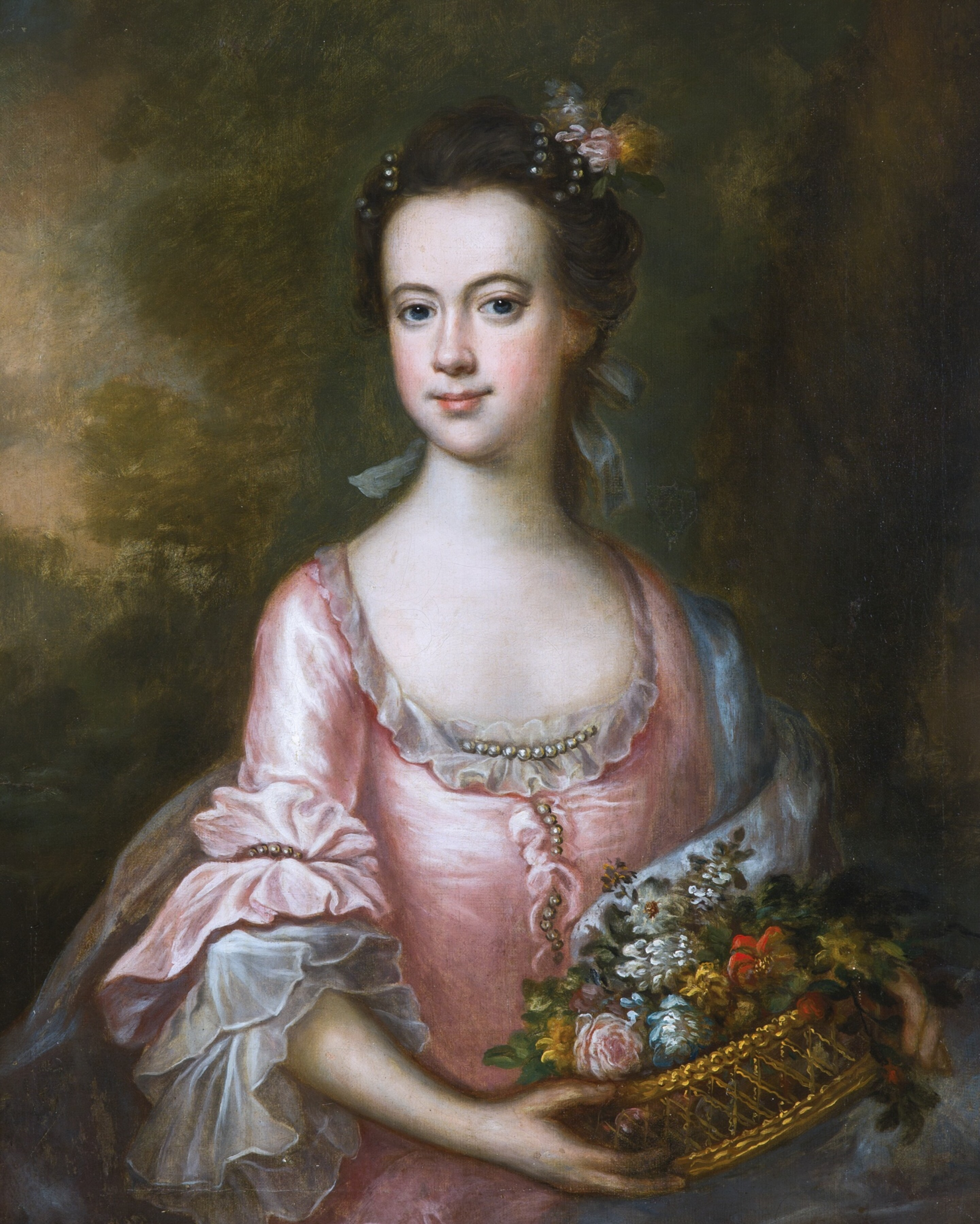
Rachel Busk, later Mrs Richard Milnes (d. 1835), half-length, wearing a pink dress and holding flowers

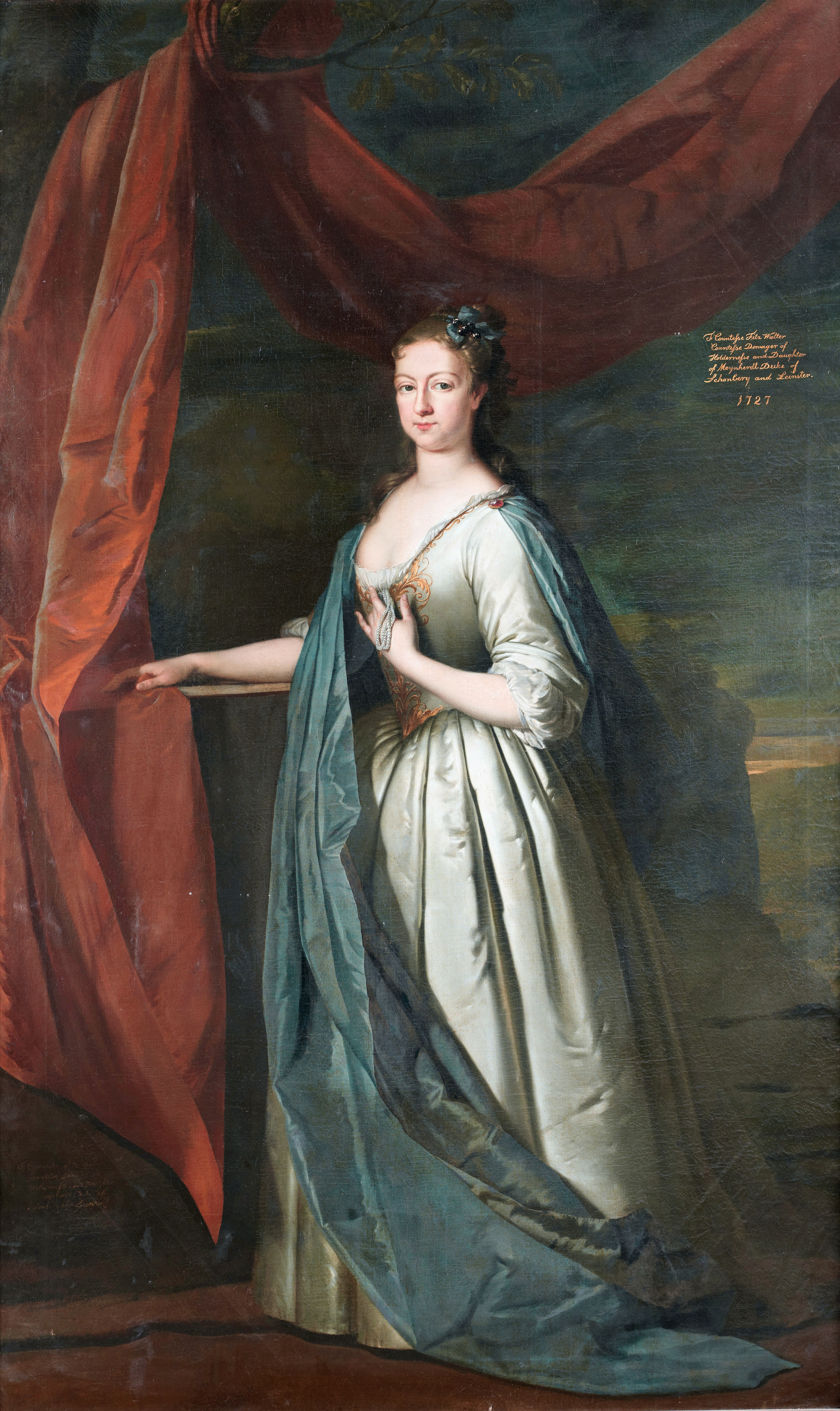
Frederica, Countess FitzWalter, 1727

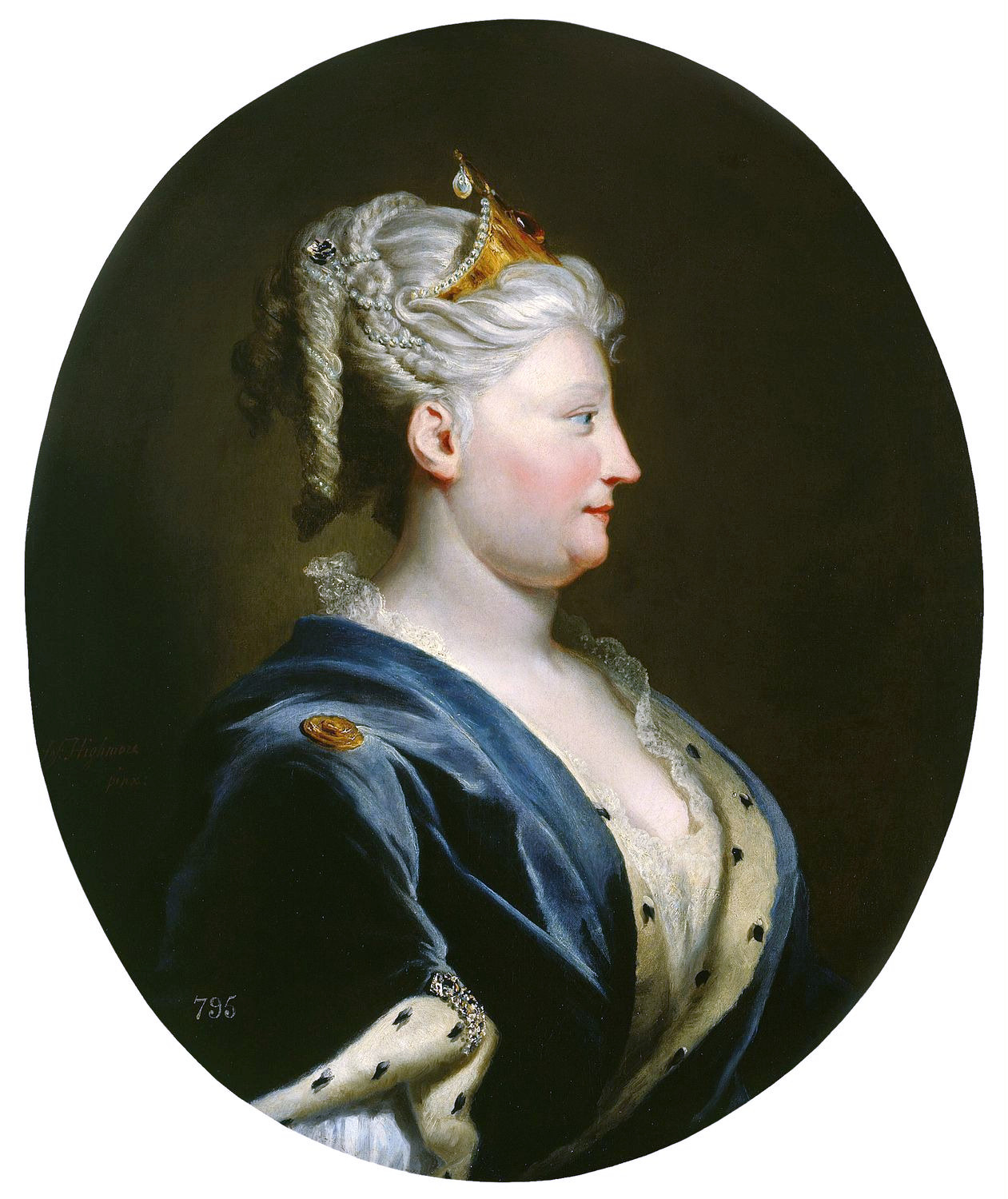
Queen Caroline of Great Britain and Ireland, 1735

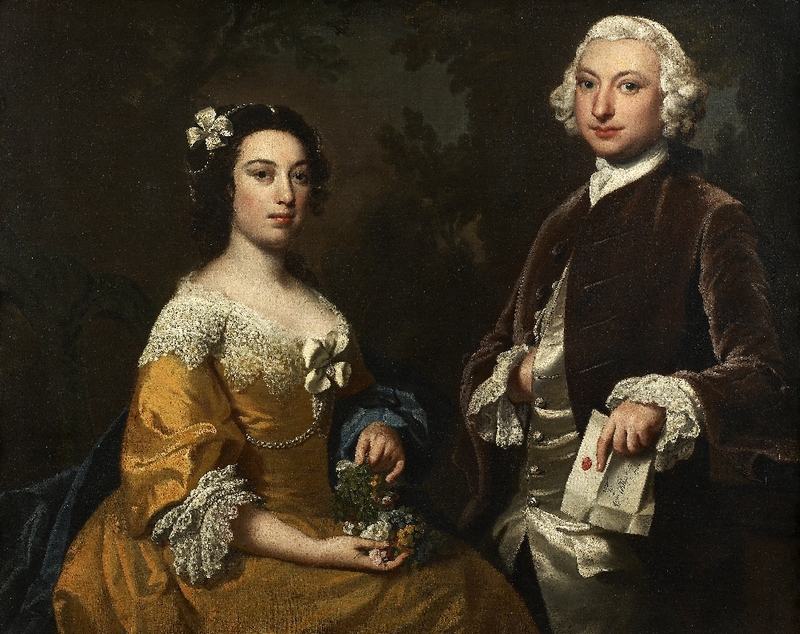
William Wilberforce (1721–1777), and Hannah Wilberforce, née Thornton, 1750

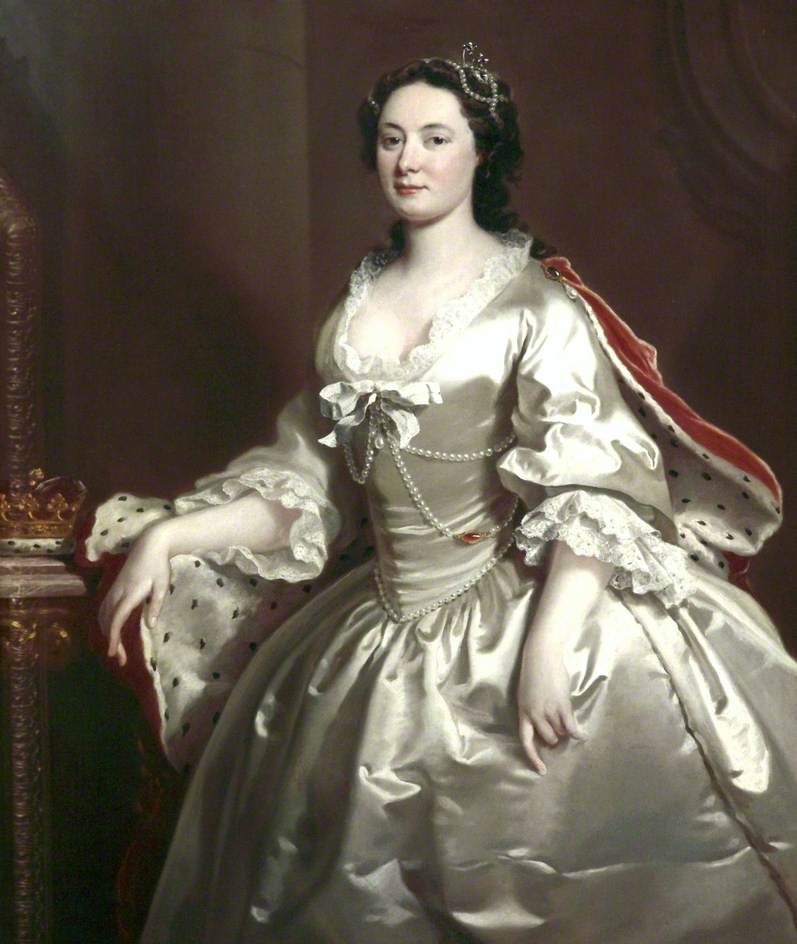
The Duchess of Chandos, 1746

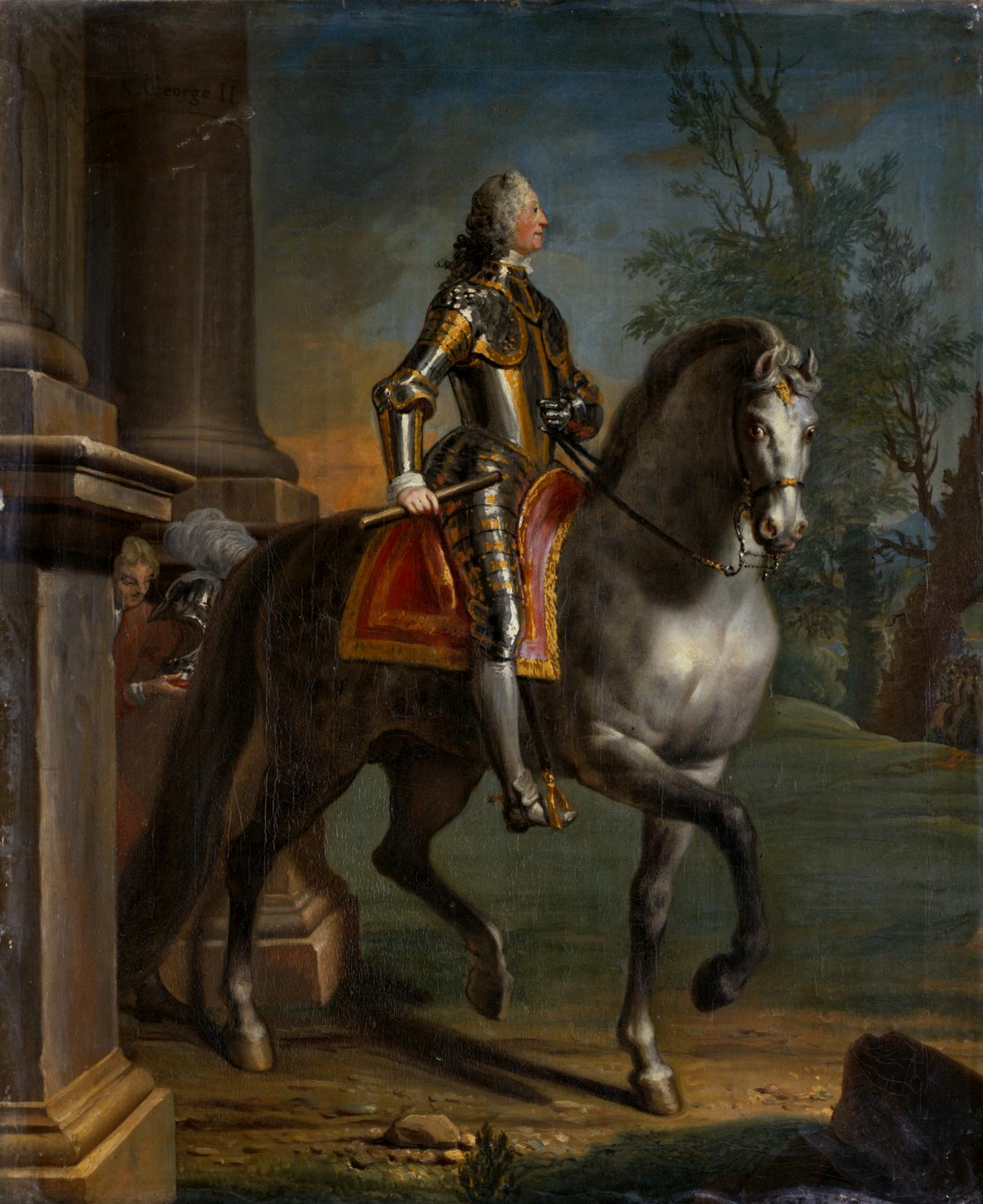
Equestrian Portrait of King George II, 1743/1745
