= Anthony Highmore =

English draughtsman (1719–1799)

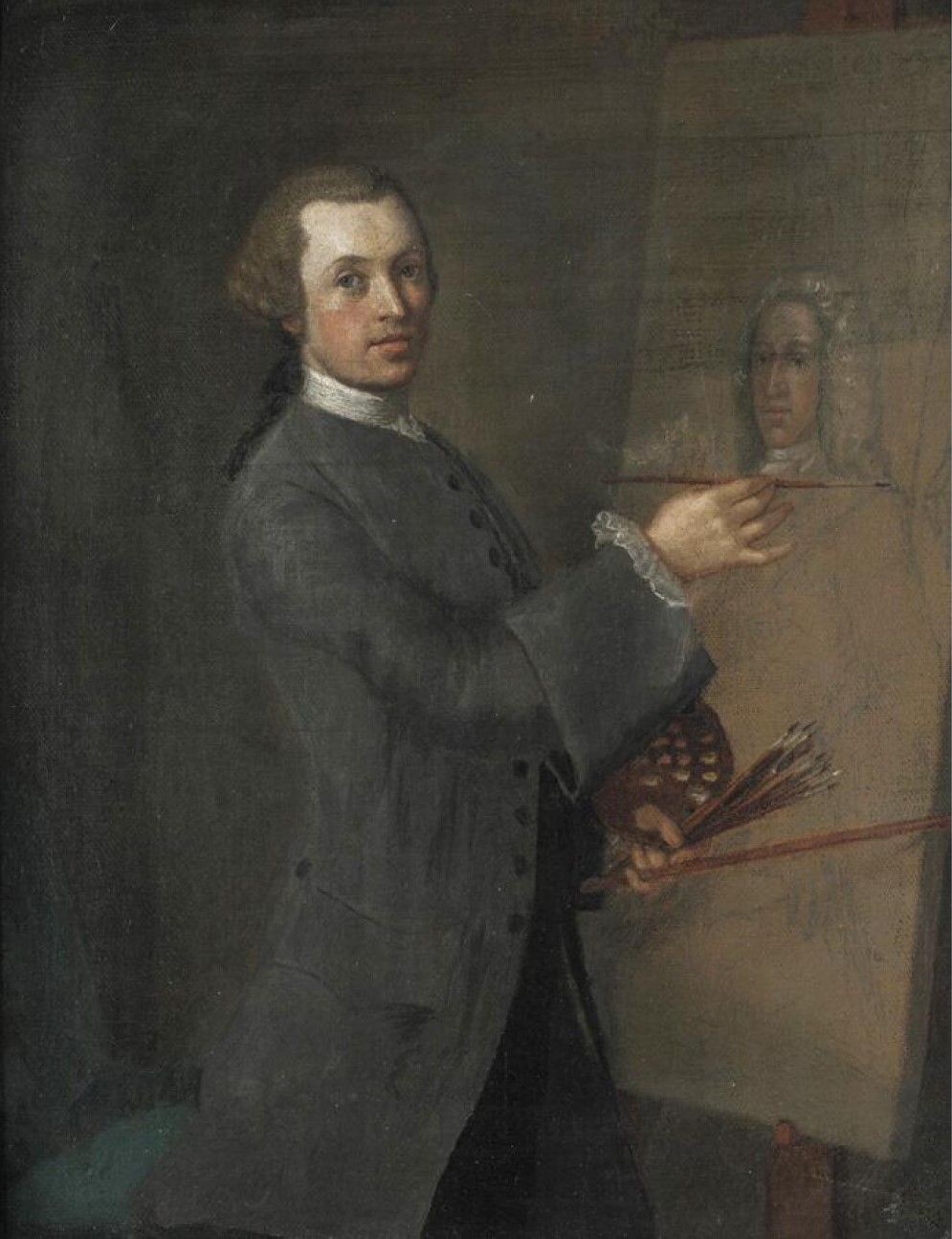
Anthony Highmore, painting attributed to Joseph Highmore

Anthony Highmore (1719–1799) was an English draughtsman.

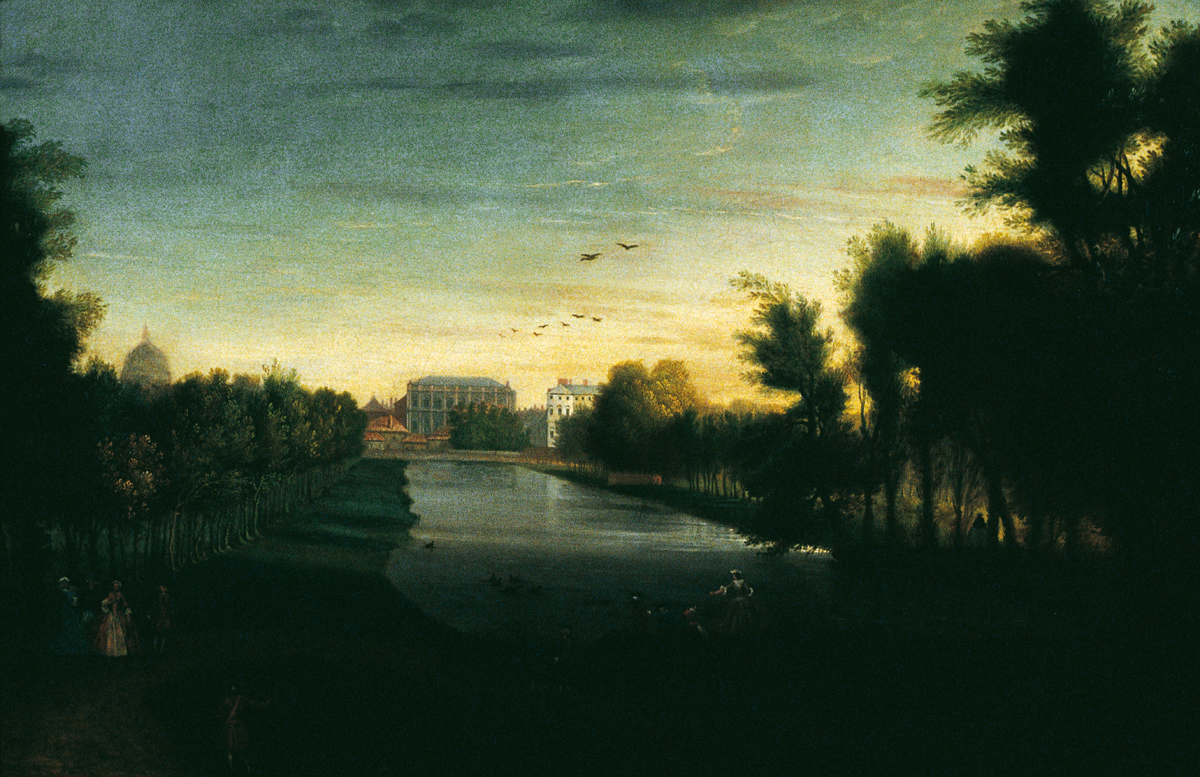
St. James's Park and the Banqueting House in London, by Anthony Highmore

== Life ==
He was the only son of Joseph Highmore, known for five views of Hampton Court, engraved by John Tinney. He was deaf, and resided mostly at Canterbury, where he studied theology. He died on 3 October 1799, in his eighty-first year.

== Family ==
Highmore married early in life Anna Maria, daughter of the Rev. Seth Ellis of Brampton, Derbyshire. They had fifteen children, one of whom was Anthony Highmore the legal writer.
