= Anthony Highmore (legal writer) =

English legal writer (1758–1829)

Anthony Highmore (1758–1829) was an English legal writer, known also for works on London charities and the Honourable Artillery Company.

== Life ==
The son of Anthony Highmore, he was born in London in 1768. In 1766 he was sent to school under Charles Burney at Greenwich. He went into practice as a solicitor in 1783.

Highmore was an abolitionist and friend of Granville Sharp. He also promoted Charles James Fox's act on the law of libel.

During the Napoleonic Wars alarm created by threatened invasion, Highmore became a member of the Honourable Artillery Company. The secretary to the London Lying-in Hospital, he advocated for the public dispensary movement as more cost-effective than hospitals.

Highmore died at Dulwich 19 July 1829.

== Works ==
In 1808 a bill was brought before parliament to prevent the spread of smallpox. No medical practitioner was to inoculate for the smallpox within three miles of any town, and provisions were made for isolating smallpox patients. Highmore, though a believer in the alternative of vaccination, opposed this bill in A Statement of some Objections to the Bill as amended by the Committee of the House of Commons to Prevent the Spreading of the Infection of the Small-Pox, 1808. Charles Murray replied in the same year in An Answer to Mr. Highmore's Objections.

Besides contributing to the Gentleman's Magazine, Highmore also wrote:

- A Digest of the Doctrine of Bail in Civil and Criminal Cases; compiled from the various Authorities and Reports of Cases adjudged, &c., 1783.
- A Succinct View of the History of Mortmain and the Statutes relative to Charitable Uses; with a full Exposition of the late Statute of Mortmain, 9 George II, c. 36, and its subsequent Alterations, 1787; 2nd edition, enlarged, 1809.
- Reflections on the distinction usually adopted in Criminal Prosecutions for Libel, and on the method lately introduced of pronouncing Verdicts in consequence of such distinction, 1791.
- Addenda to the Law of Charitable Uses, 1793.
- A Practical Arrangement of the Laws relative to the Excise, 2 vols., 1796.
- The History of the Honourable Artillery Company of the City of London from its earliest Annals to the Peace of 1802, 1804; written at the suggestion of the court of assistants.
- A Treatise on the Law of Idiotcy and Lunacy, 1807; American edit., 1822.
- A Letter to William Wilberforce, Esq., M.P., relative to the second Bill introduced by him to the House of Commons … for Registering Charitable Donations, &c., 1810.
- Observations on the Amended Bill now depending in the House of Commons "For the Registering and securing of Charitable Donations for the benefit of poor persons in England", 1810.
- Pietas Londinensis: the History, Design, and Present State of the various Public Charities in and near London, 1810.
- The Attorneys and Solicitors' new Pocket-Book and Conveyancers' Assistant, by F. C. Jones … Third edition, with corrections and additional modern precedents, by Anthony Highmore, 1814.
- An Arrangement of the Accounts necessary to be kept by Executors of Wills and Codicils and Administrators of Intestates' Estates. To which are prefixed Tables of the New Duties on Probates and Administrations, 1815; 2nd edit., enlarged, 1821.
- Philanthropia Metropolitana: a View of the Charitable Institutions established in and near London chiefly during the last twelve years, 1822.

In 1876 A Ramble on the Coast of Sussex in 1782 was edited by Charles Hindley from a manuscript of Highmore.

== Notes ==
Attribution

This article incorporates text from a publication now in the public domain: Stephen, Leslie; Lee, Sidney, eds. (1891). "Highmore, Anthony". Dictionary of National Biography. Vol. 26. London: Smith, Elder & Co.
