= Royal Swans =

Flock of swans in Ottawa, a royal gift

The Royal Swans are a flock of swans of two species—the mute swan (Cygnus olor) and the black swan (C. atratus)—the original six pairs of which were a gift to the city of Ottawa from Queen Elizabeth II in 1967, to commemorate the Canadian Centennial. Since then, the number of Royal Swans has increased to the point that they now occupy the waters of the Rideau River between Carleton University and Cummings Bridge.

== See also ==
- Canadian royal symbols
- Swan upping
