= Swan Lifeline =

Non-profit UK rehabilitation organization

- Formation: 1986
- Founders: Tim Heron, Jane Castling, Ginny James
- Type: CIO
- Purpose: Rescue, rehabilitation and release of swans and wildfowl.
- Location: Eton, Berkshire, England
- Region served: Berkshire, Buckinghamshire, Oxfordshire, Hampshire, Hertfordshire
- Key people: Trustees: Julian Nichols; Tania Dawson; Gemma Nelson
- Website: swanlifeline.uk

Swan Lifeline is the oldest registered charity devoted entirely to the care of sick and injured swans in the Thames Valley and surrounding areas. It is a non-profit organization dedicated to the rescue, rehabilitation and release of swans and other non-alien waterfowl. Founded in 1986, it has been actively involved in educating the public about the incidence and effects of pollution and human activities on swans and other wildfowl on the UK's rivers and waterways.

== Avian Flu ==
In January 2022, 26 swans at Swan Lifeline were culled by Animal and Plant Health Agency (APHA), overseen by the Department for Environment, Food and Rural Affairs (DEFRA). Four swans had already died from the disease and the culling was done to prevent spread. A three km protection zone was set up around the site, which ended on 21 April 2022 after 109 days.

== Mission and Activities ==
Swan Lifeline's mission is to create a better, healthier and safer environment for swans and general wildlife in the UK.

The charity provides training in swan-handling to the Thames Valley Police, Fire and Rescue Services and Network Rail, as well as providing work-experience and training for students at the Berkshire College of Agriculture and the Royal Veterinary College.

== Impact ==
Swan Lifeline started a campaign in the 1980s to successfully ban the use of lead weights used by anglers. Lead poisoning leads to botulism in swans.

Swan Lifeline works with the Marker of the Swans, the British Trust for Ornithology, the Edward Grey Institute of Field Ornithology and the Crown's Warden of the Swans - Chris Perrins LVO FRS. Swan Lifeline was the primary statistical source for Perrin's (et al) paper on The Impact of Lost and Discarded Fishing Line and Tackle on Mute Swans (2002)

Notable rescues include a swan that landed on the roof of the number 19a Little Orange bus in Reading, Berkshire, on 17 February 2023.

== Controversies ==
In 2018, the pet food brand Wild Things teamed up with Swan Lifeline and the Wildfowl & Wetlands Trust to keep bread away from all ponds and lakes. The 'Ban the Bread' campaign was developed to encourage the public to look after their local wildlife responsibly and educate them on healthier alternatives available.

Swan Lifeline ceased their association with the Wild Things' campaign and now advises that the public should feed swans bread, but in moderation. The WWT also now advises to feed bread in limited situations.

== Patrons ==
Notable patrons have included:

- George Michael
- Sir Michael Parkinson CBE

== Governance and Funding ==
The charity is governed by a board of trustees. It is entirely funded by donations and grants.

== Awards and recognition ==
In November 2023, one of its trustees and volunteers - Cindy Smulders - won two awards at the #OneSlough Awards: The first for Supporting Children and Young People; and the second for Making a Difference to the Environment.
