= Keeper of the Queen's Swans =

Former royal office in England

The Keeper of the King's/Queen's Swans was a late medieval-founded office in the Royal Household of the Sovereign of England, later Great Britain and ultimately the United Kingdom. He was earlier called the King's/Queen's Swanmaster. The office existed to perform Swan-Upping marking and health-checking carried out using Thames skiffs on many of the non-tidal reaches of the River Thames in latter years from Sunbury-on-Thames passing Windsor, Berkshire to Henley on Thames. In 1993 it was replaced by two separate offices: Warden of the Swans and Marker of the Swans.

== History ==
The keeper's office dates from the 13th century. He was supported by three swanherdsmen. The principal duties of this official team of four people were to conduct the annual Swan-Upping on much of non-tidal reaches of the River Thames including Windsor.

It was abolished in 1993, when it was replaced by two new offices, the Warden of the Swans and the Marker of the Swans.

== List of Keepers of the King's and Queen's Swans ==
- Sir William ANDREWS of Lathbury, Bucks, 1620s (d.1625)
- Thomas Alexander Roberts, 1807–after 1825
- J. K. Abnett
- Thomas R. Abnett, 1893– (in office 1900)
- Frederick Thomas Turk, MVO, 1923–1963
- Cpt. Frederick John ('John') Turk, MVO, 1963–1993
