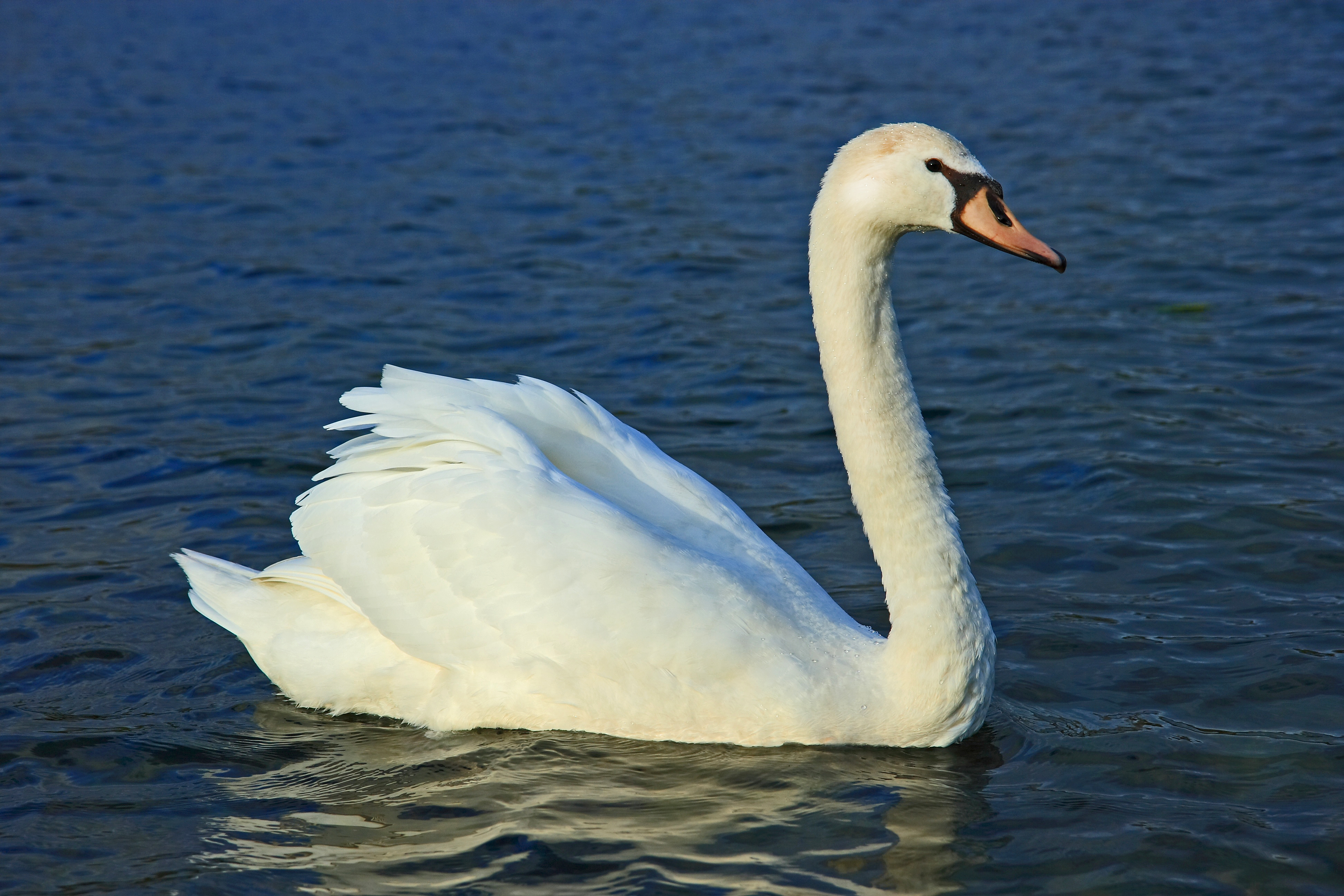
- Mute swan swimming, France
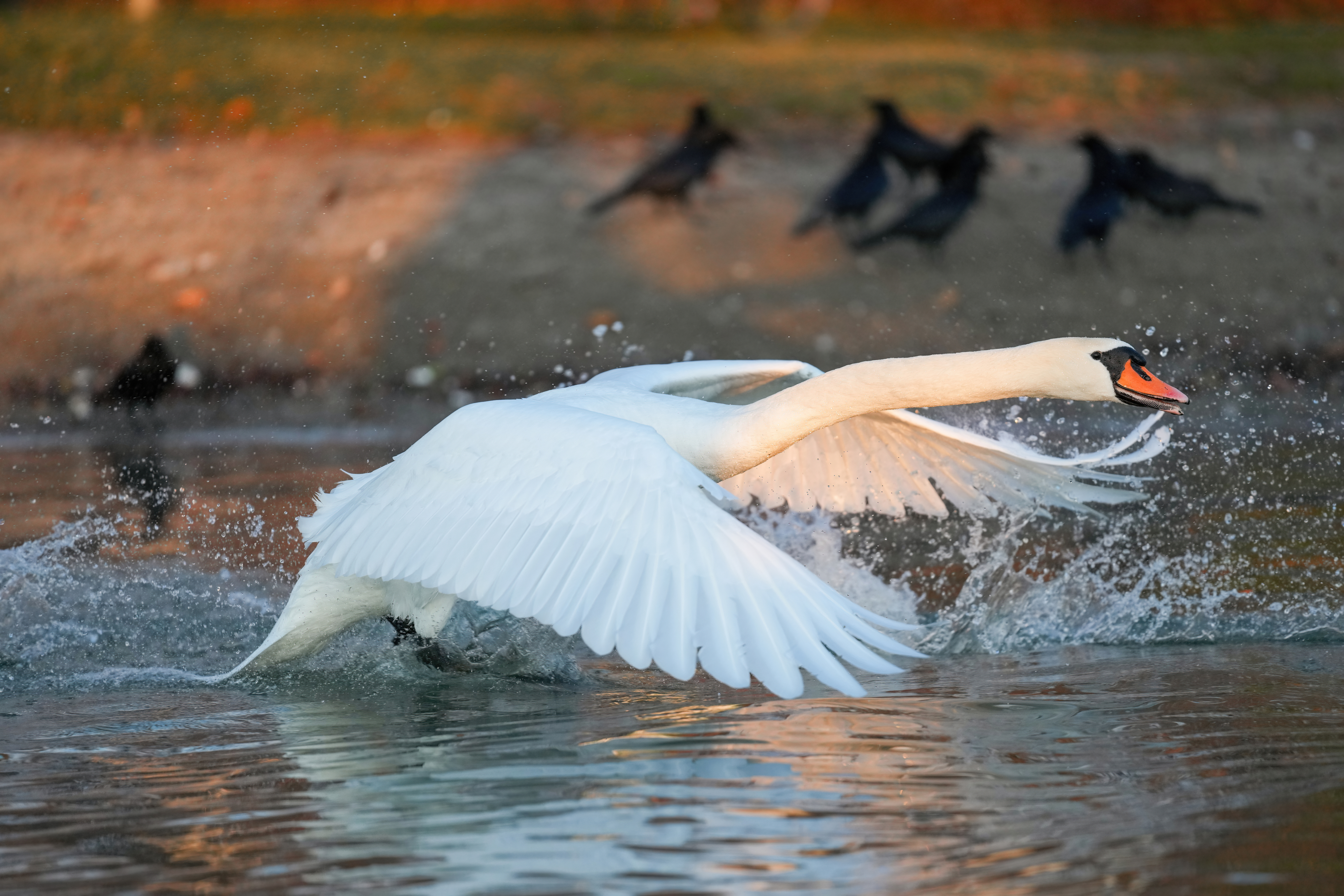
- In flight, Switzerland

Conservation status
- Least Concern (IUCN 3.1)

Scientific classification
- Kingdom: Animalia
- Phylum: Chordata
- Class: Aves
- Order: Anseriformes
- Family: Anatidae
- Genus: Cygnus
- Species: C. olor

Binomial name
- Cygnus olor (J.F.Gmelin, 1789)
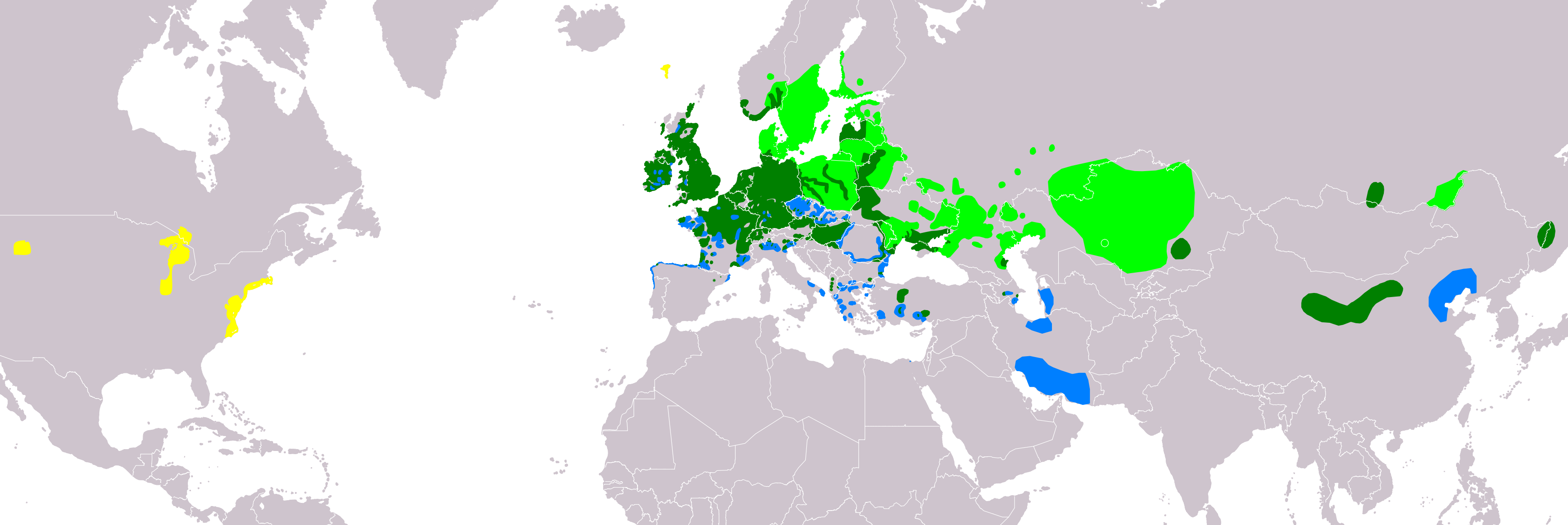
- Distribution map of mute swan Summer breeding range Year-round breeding range Winter non-breeding range Non-native range (partial)

Synonyms
- Anas olor J.F.Gmelin, 1789; Sthenelides olor (J.F.Gmelin, 1789); Cygnus immutabilis (Yarrell, 1838); Olor olor

Audio
- Sound of a mute swan's wingbeats

= Mute swan =

Mute swan Temporal range: Chibanian–Present

Large species of waterfowl

The mute swan (Cygnus olor) is a species of swan and a member of the family Anatidae within the waterfowl order. It is native to much of Europe and parts of Asia and (as a rare winter visitor) the far north of Africa. It is an introduced species in North America, home to the largest populations outside of its native range, with additional smaller introductions in Australasia and Southern Africa. The name "mute" derives from it being less vocal than other swan species. Typically measuring 140 to 160 cm (55 to 63 in) in length, this large swan is wholly white in plumage, with an orange beak bordered with black. It is recognisable by its pronounced knob atop the beak, which is larger in males.

== Taxonomy ==
The mute swan was first formally named by the German naturalist Johann Friedrich Gmelin as Anas olor in 1789 and was transferred by Johann Matthäus Bechstein to the new genus Cygnus in 1803. Both cygnus and olor mean 'swan' in Latin; cygnus is a variant form of cycnus, borrowing from Greek κύκνος kyknos, a word of the same meaning.

Despite its Eurasian origin, its closest relatives are the black swan of Australia and the black-necked swan of South America, not the other Northern Hemisphere swans of the genus Cygnus. The species is monotypic, with no living subspecies.

== Evolution ==
Mute swan subfossils, dating back 6,000 years, have been found in post-glacial peat beds of East Anglia, Great Britain. They have been recorded from Ireland east to Portugal and Italy, and from France, 13,000 BP (Desbrosse and Mourer-Chauvire 1972–1973). Cygnus olor bergmanni, a paleosubspecies that differed only in size from the living bird, is known from fossils found in Azerbaijan. A related paleospecies recorded from fossils and subfossils is the giant swan, Cygnus falconeri, a flightless species that lived on the islands of Malta and Sicily during the Middle Pleistocene.

Fossils of swan ancestors more distantly allied to the mute swan have been found in four U.S. states: California, Arizona, Idaho, and Oregon. The timeline runs from the Miocene to the late Pleistocene or 10,000 BP. The latest find was in Anza-Borrego Desert, a state park in California. Fossils from the Pleistocene include Cygnus paloregonus from Fossil Lake, Oregon, Froman's Ferry, Idaho, and Arizona, referred to by Howard in The Waterfowl of the World as "probably the mute type swan".

== Description ==
Adults of this large swan typically range from 140 to 160 cm (55 to 63 in) long, although they can range in extreme cases from 125 to 170 cm (49 to 67 in), with a 200 to 240 cm (79 to 94 in) wingspan. Males are larger than females and have a larger knob on their bill. On average, this is the second largest waterfowl species after the trumpeter swan, although male mute swans can easily match or even exceed a male trumpeter in mass. Among standard measurements of the mute swan, the wing chord measures 53–62.3 cm (20.9–24.5 in), the tarsus is 10–11.8 cm (3.9–4.6 in), and the bill is 6.9–9 cm (2.7–3.5 in). The plumage is white, while the legs are dark grey. The beak of the mute swan is bright orange, with black around the nostrils and a black nail.

The mute swan is one of the heaviest extant flying birds. In several studies from Great Britain, males (known as cobs) were found to average from about 10.6 to 11.87 kg (23.4 to 26.2 lb), with a weight range of 9.2–14.3 kg (20–32 lb), while the slightly smaller females (known as pens) averaged about 8.5 to 9.67 kg (18.7 to 21.3 lb), with a weight range of 7.6–10.6 kg (17–23 lb). While the top normal weight for a big cob is roughly 15 kg (33 lb), one unusually big Polish cob weighed almost 23 kg (51 lb), and this counts as the largest weight ever verified for a flying bird, although it has been questioned whether this heavyweight could still take flight. Mute swans can achieve speeds in flight of up to 88.5 km/h (55 mph), and during takeoff they achieve speeds of around 48 km/h (30 mph) when running to gain lift.

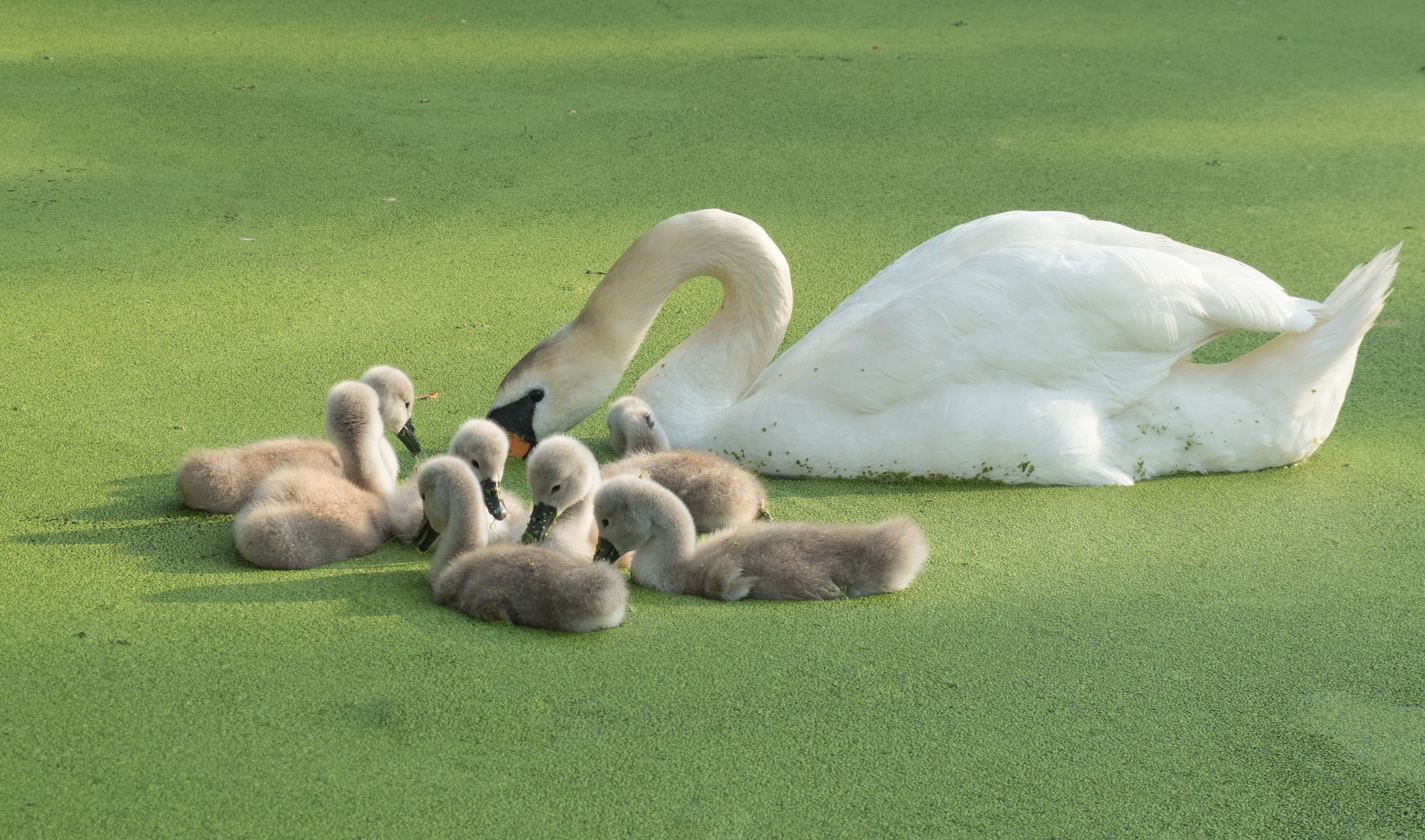
Mute swan with cygnets on a duckweed-covered lake

Young birds, called cygnets, are not the bright white of mature adults, and their bill is dull greyish-black, not orange, for the first year. The down may range from pure white to grey to buff, with grey/buff the most common. The white cygnets have a leucistic gene. Cygnets grow quickly, reaching a size close to their adult size in approximately three months after hatching. Cygnets typically retain their grey feathers until they are at least one year old, with the down on their wings having been replaced by flight feathers earlier that year.

All mute swans are white at maturity, though the feathers (particularly on the head and neck) are often stained orange-brown by iron and tannins in the water.

=== Polish swan ===
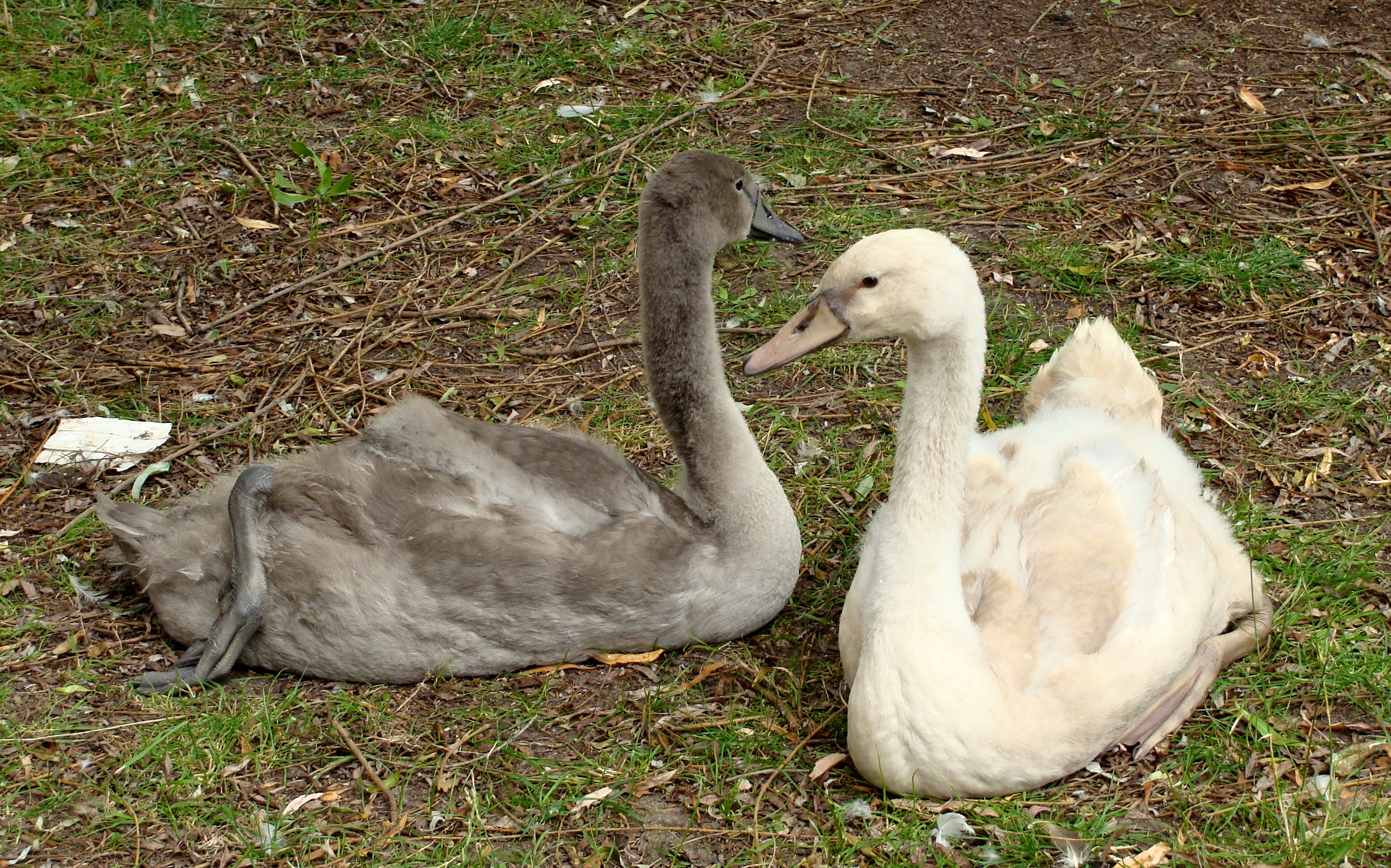
Two mute swan cygnets a few weeks old; the cygnet on the right is of the "Polish swan" colour morph, expressing the recessive gene responsible for leucism.

The colour morph C. o. morpha immutabilis (immūtābilis is Latin for "immutable, unchangeable, unalterable"), also known as the "Polish swan", has pinkish (not dark grey) legs and dull-white cygnets; as with white domestic geese, it is found only in populations with a history of domestication. Polish swans carry a copy of a gene responsible for leucism.

== Behaviour ==
Unlike black swans, mute swans are usually strongly territorial, with just a single pair on smaller lakes, though in a few locations where a large area of suitable feeding habitat is found, they can be colonial. The largest colonies have over 100 pairs, such as at the colony at Abbotsbury Swannery in Southern England and at the southern tip of Öland, Ottenby Preserve, in the coastal waters of the Baltic Sea; they can have nests spaced as little as 2 m (7 ft) apart. Non-mated juveniles up to 3–4 years old commonly form larger flocks, which can total several hundred birds, often at regular traditional sites. A notable flock of non-breeding birds is found on the River Tweed estuary at Berwick-upon-Tweed in Northeastern England, with a maximum count of 787 birds. A large population exists near the Swan Lifeline Station in Windsor and lives on the Thames in the shadow of Windsor Castle. Once the adults are mated, they seek out their territories and often live close to ducks and gulls, which may take advantage of the swan's ability to reach deep water weeds that tend to spread out on the water surface.

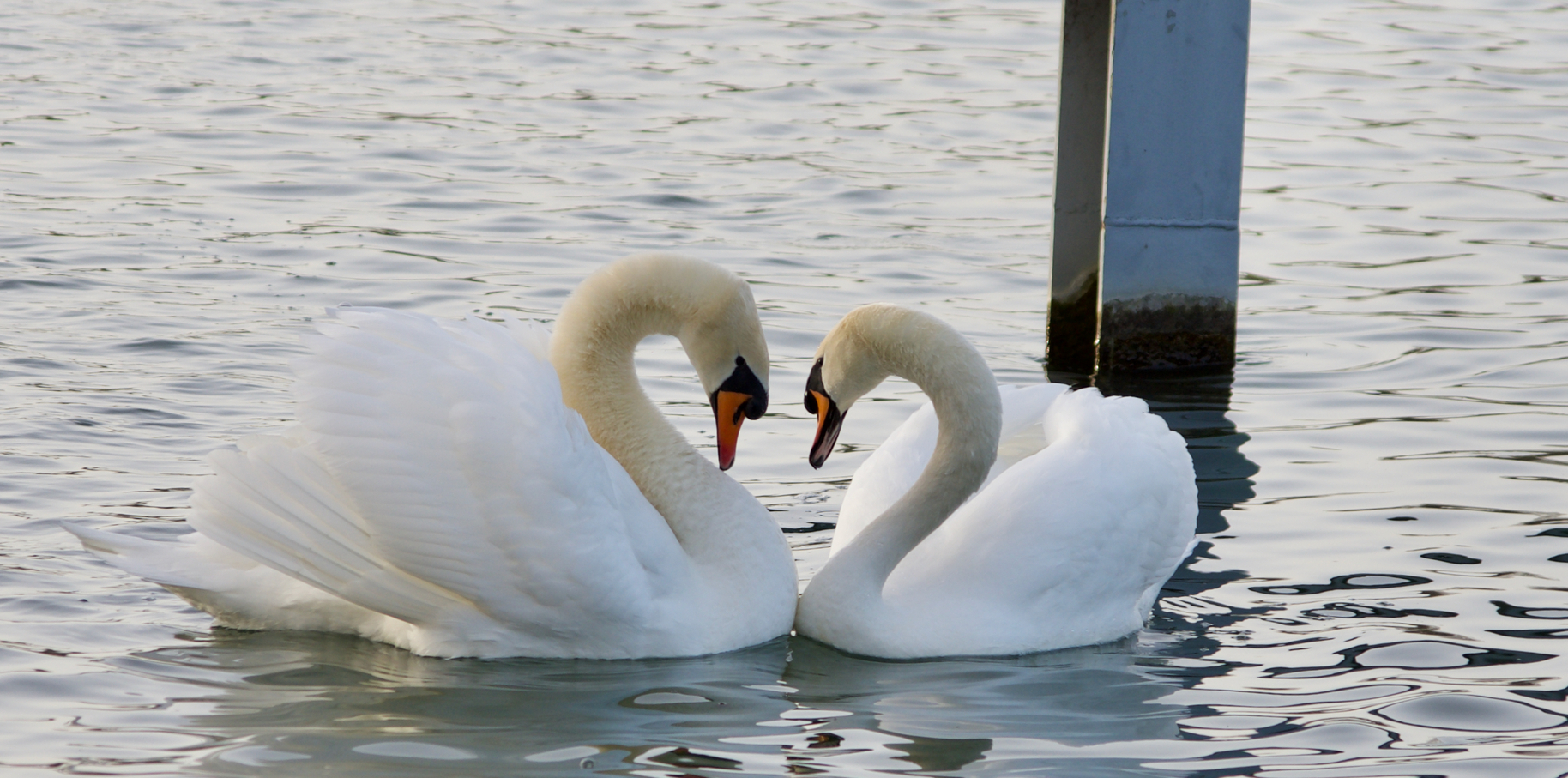
Courtship, in Switzerland

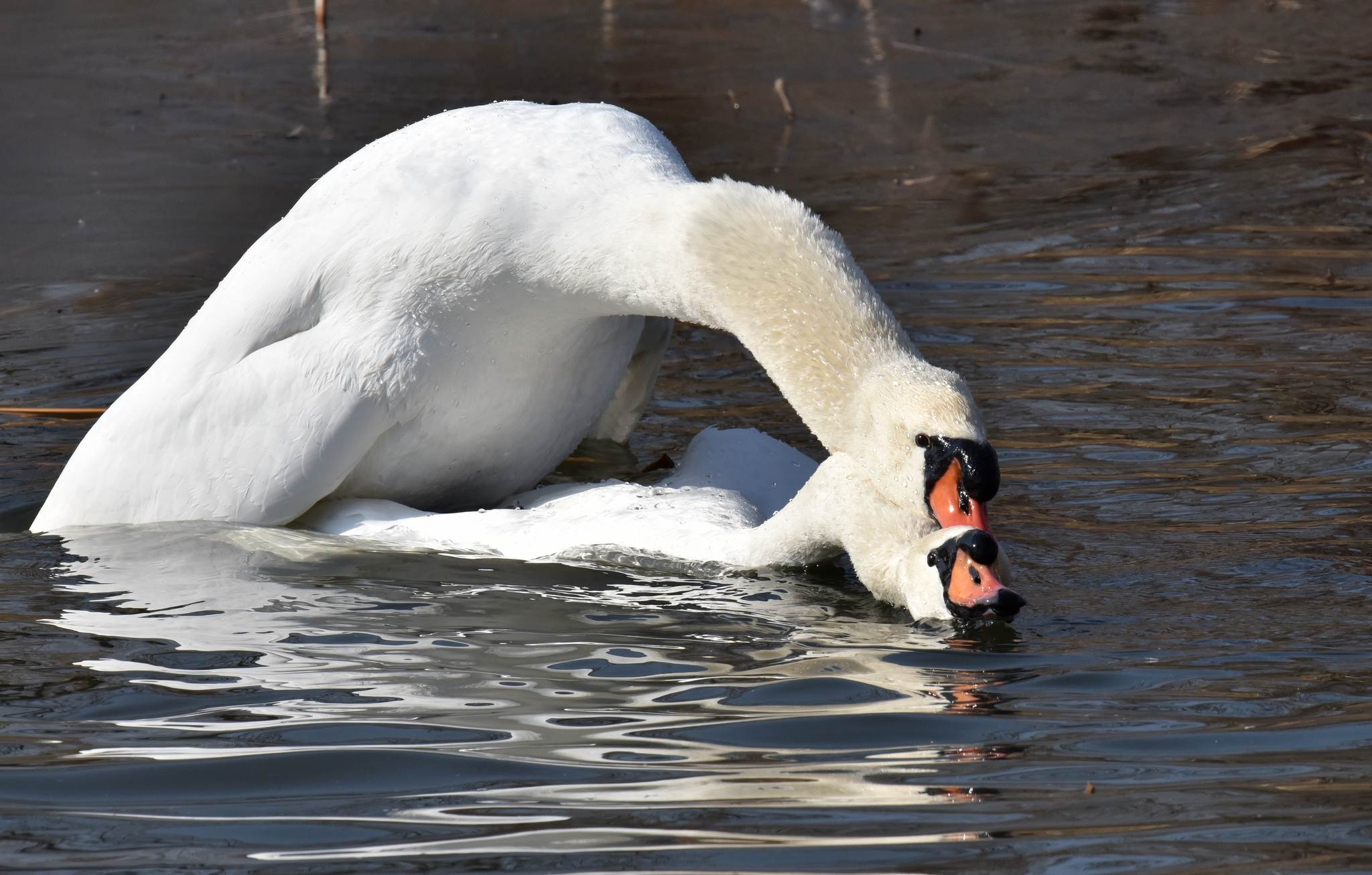
Mating, in Henan, China

The mute swan is less vocal than the noisy whooper and tundra swans; they do, however, make a variety of sounds, often described as "grunting, hoarse whistling, and snorting noises". During a courtship display, mute swans utter a rhythmic song. The song helps synchronize the movements of their heads and necks; it could technically be employed to distinguish a bonded couple from two dating swans, as the rhythm of the song typically fails to match the pace of the head movements of two dating swans. Mute swans usually hiss at competitors or intruders trying to enter their territory. The most familiar sound associated with mute swans is the vibrant throbbing of the wings in flight, which is unique to the species and can be heard from a range of 1 to 2 km (0.6 to 1 mi), indicating its value as a contact sound between birds in flight. Cygnets are especially vocal and communicate through a variety of whistling and chirping sounds when content, as well as a harsher chirping noise when distressed or lost.

Busking, a pose with the neck curved back and wings half raised, is a common threat display. Both feet are paddled in unison during this display, resulting in more jerky movement. The swans may also use the busking posture for wind-assisted transportation over several hundred meters, so-called windsurfing.

To avoid rivals or capture, mute swans are capable of diving several meters underwater for distances of 40–50 m (130–160 ft). As in other swans, they do not dive while foraging. Cygnets can dive when they reach three weeks of age.

=== Diet ===
They feed on a wide range of vegetation, both by reaching submerged aquatic plants with their long necks and by grazing on land. The food commonly includes agricultural crop plants such as oilseed rape and wheat, and in winter, feeding flocks may cause significant crop damage — often as much through trampling with their large webbed feet as through direct consumption. Mute swans also feed on small proportions of aquatic insects, fish, and frogs.

=== Breeding ===
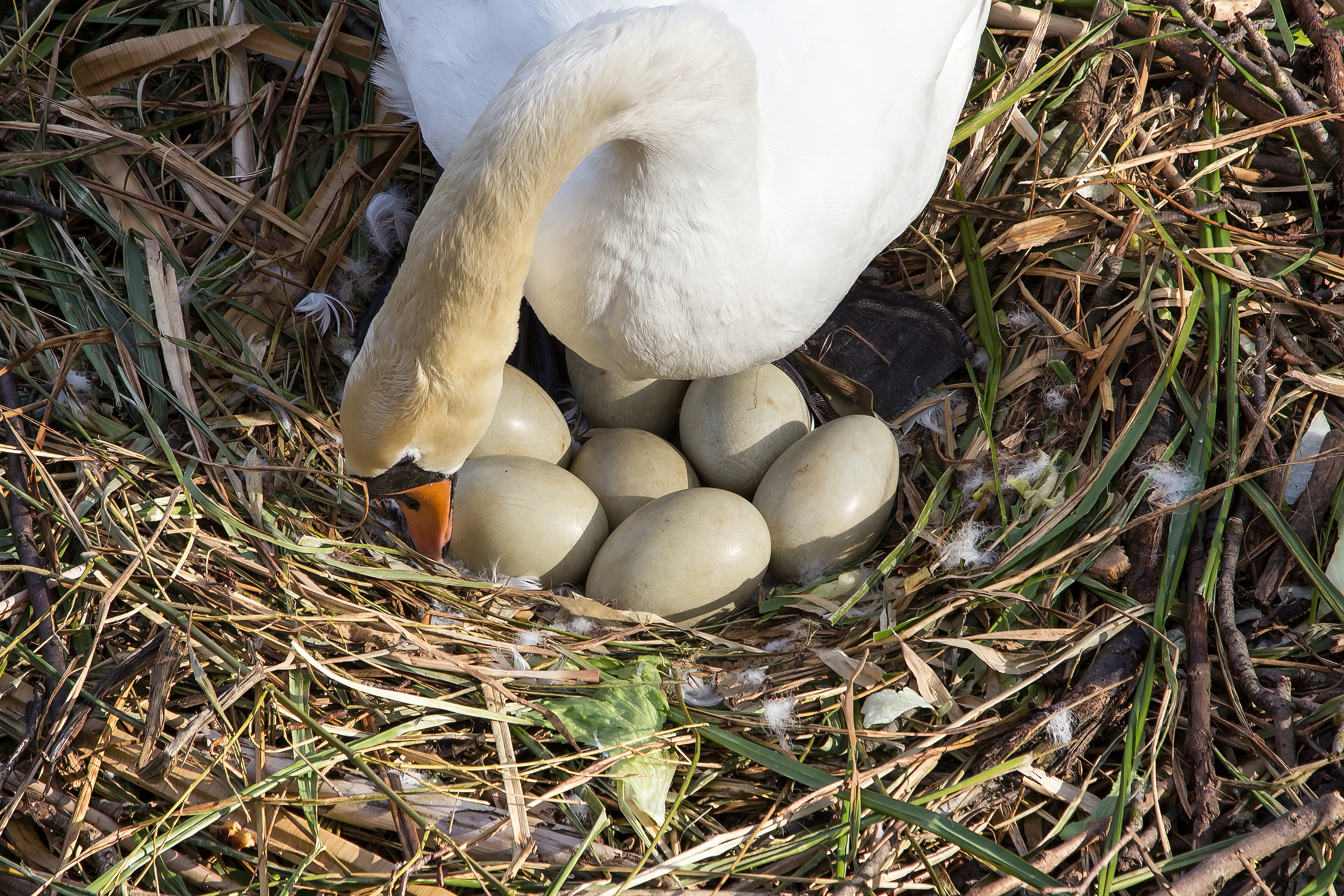
Nesting in spring, Cologne, Germany

Mute swans nest on large mounds that they build with waterside vegetation in shallow water on islands in the middle or at the very edge of a lake. They are monogamous and often reuse the same nest each year, restoring or rebuilding it as needed. Male and female swans share the care of the nest, and once the cygnets are fledged, it is not uncommon to see whole families looking for food.

Clutch size is variable and is typically 5–8 eggs, latitude of nesting and time of year can affect clutch size. The eggs of this species measure 9–12.2 cm (3.5–4.8 in) in length and 5.9–8 cm (2.3–3.1 in) in width, with a mass of 294–396 g (10.4–14.0 oz). One exceptionally large egg was over 500 g (18 oz). The female broods for around 36 days, with cygnets normally hatching between May and July.

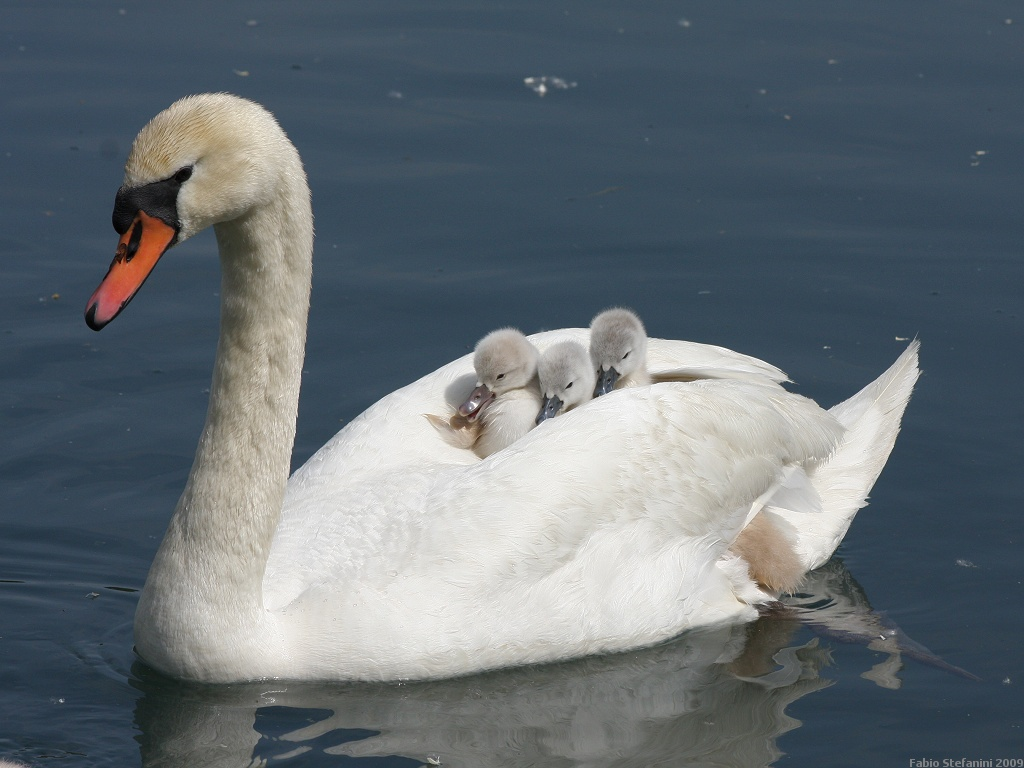
A female mute swan carrying three cygnets between her wings

Cygnets hatch weighing 180–248 g (6.3–8.7 oz). When very young, cygnets may climb onto the back of one of their parents if they become tired while on the water, with the adult proceeding to carry them around. Cygnets may also shelter beneath their parent's wings during periods of heavy rain as a means to stay warm and dry.

Mute swans can be very aggressive in defence of their nests and are highly protective of their mate and offspring. Most defensive acts from a mute swan begin with a loud hiss and, if this is not sufficient to drive off the predator or intruder, are followed by a physical attack. Swans attack by striking at the threat with bony spurs in their wings, accompanied by biting with their large bill. Large waterfowl, such as Canada geese (more likely out of competition than in response to potential predation), may be aggressively driven off. Smaller waterbirds such as ducks are normally grabbed with the swan's bill and dragged or thrown clear of the swan and its offspring. Bird intruders into a swan's territory, such as other swans, geese, and ducks, may be killed by drowning, climbing onto and pecking at the back of the head to force the other bird underwater. The cob will sometimes attack small watercraft, such as canoes, that it feels are a threat to its young.

Young swans can fly 60–65 days after hatching, although they will fledge after 120–150 days. At fledging, birds will be 70–75% of their adult mass.

A 2026 study, conducted in Poland, indicated reduced reproductive output when native Mute Swans were placed in competition against Whooper Swans.

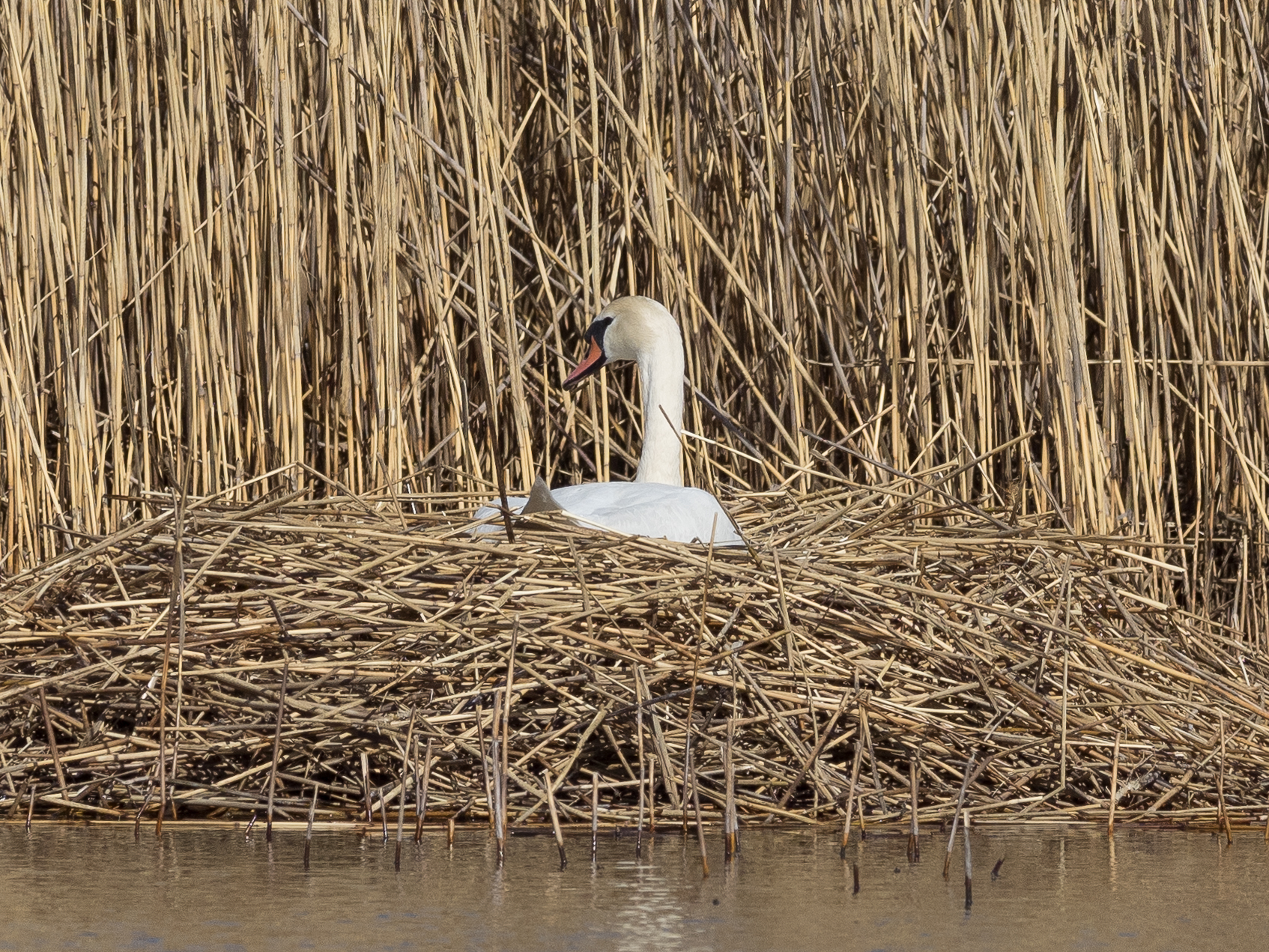
Nest of a mute swan, in Sweden

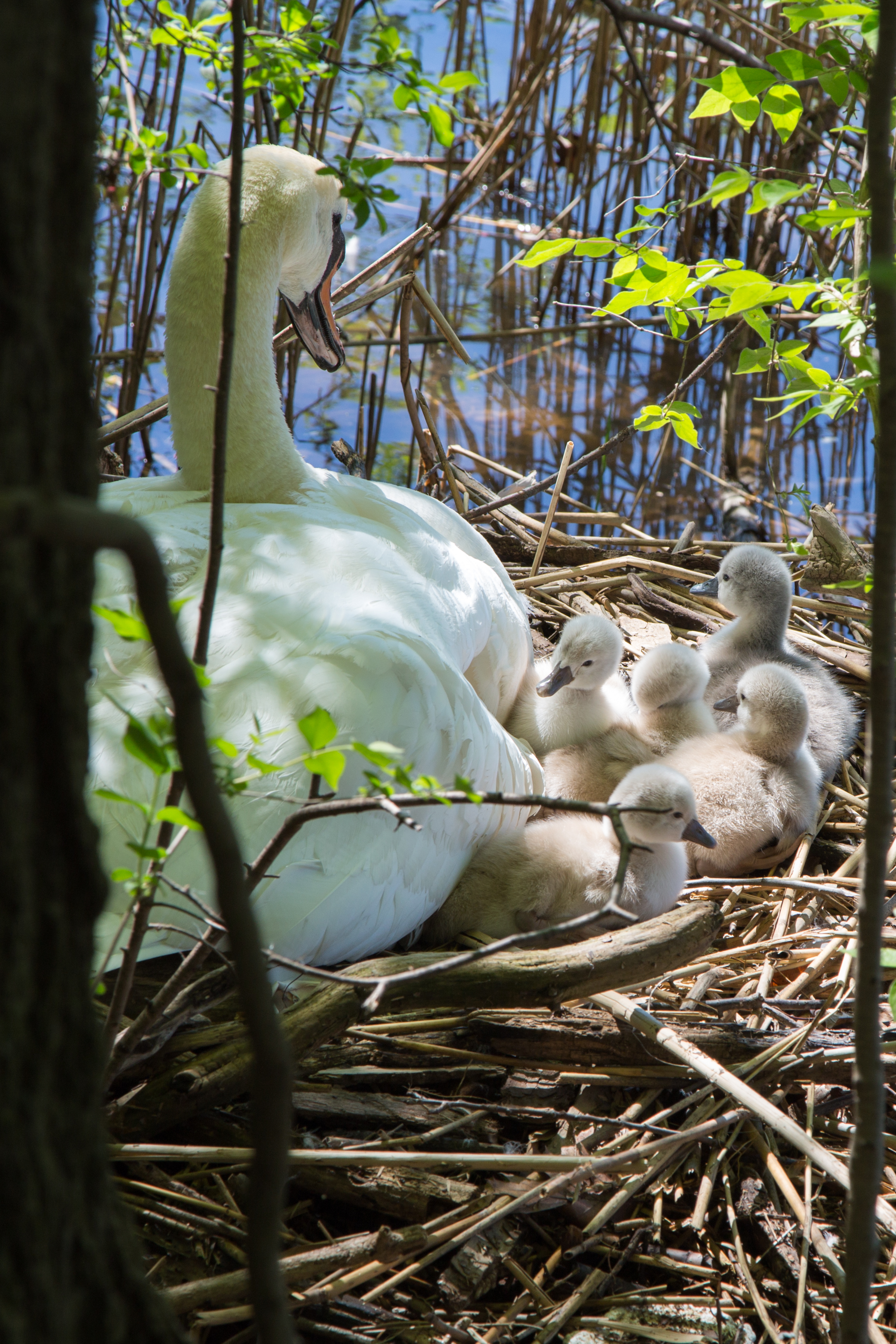
Cygnets captured one day after they hatched, in Newburgh Lake, Livonia, Michigan, U.S.

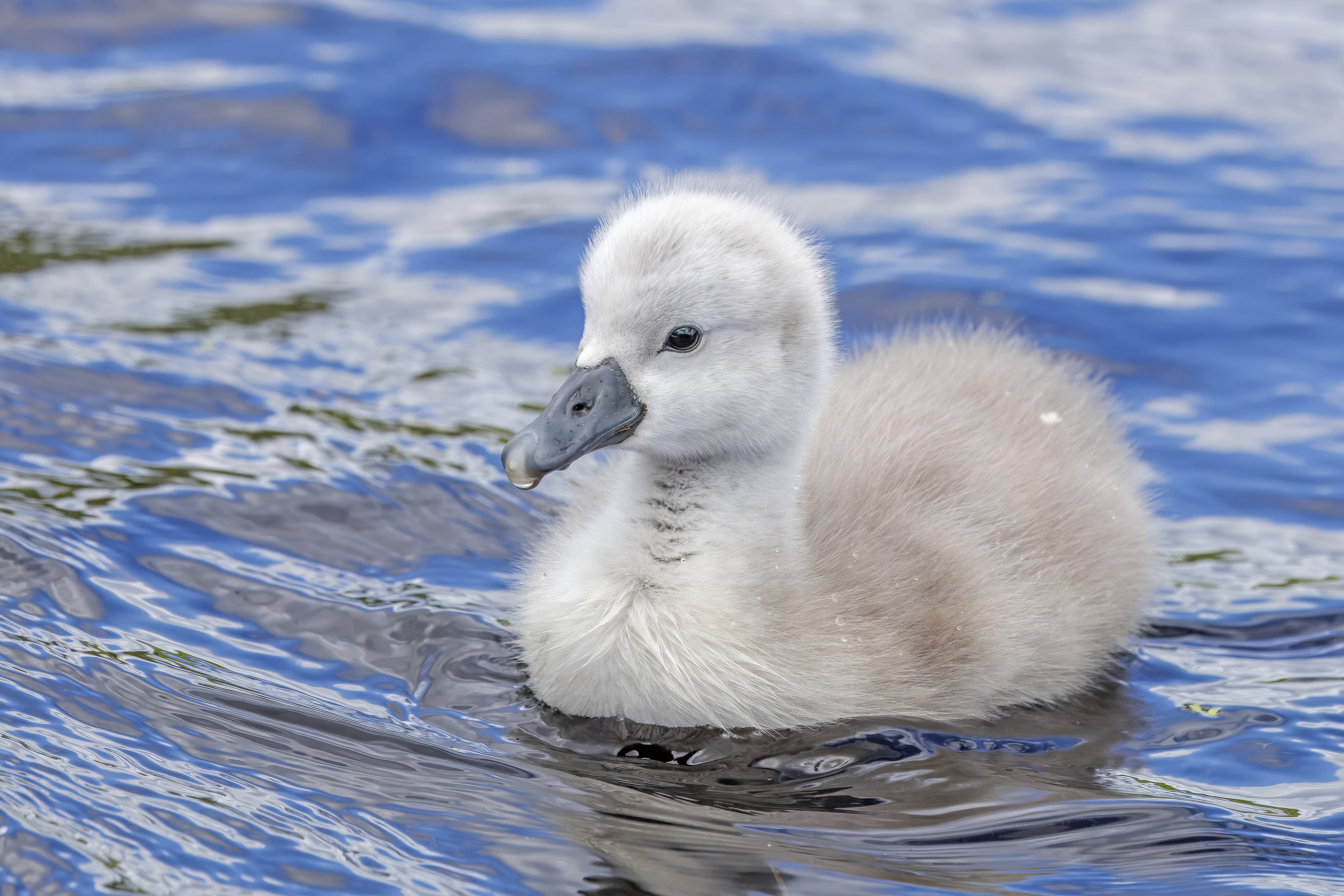
Cygnet, Denmark

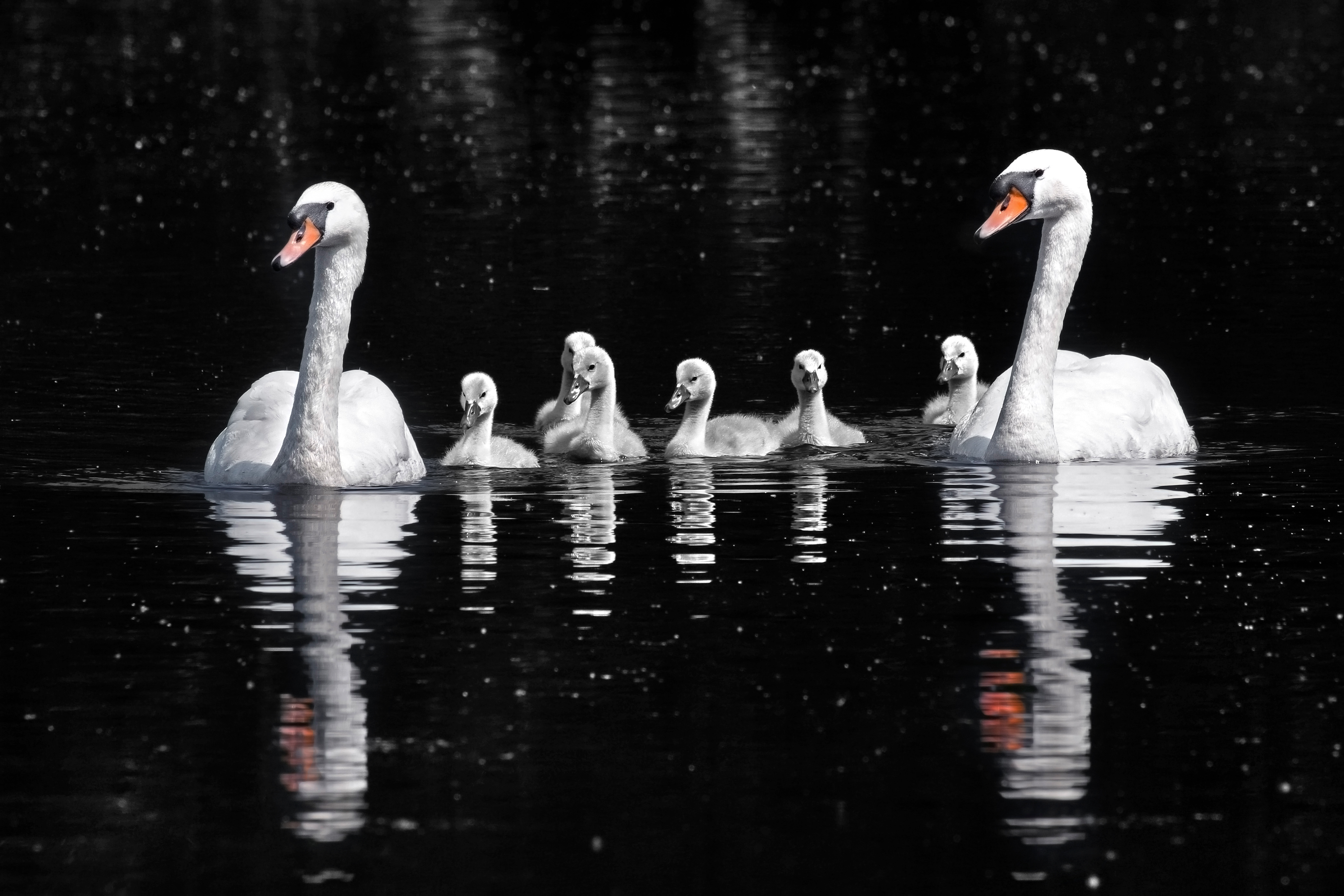
Mute swans with cygnets in Wolvercote, Oxfordshire, UK

=== Predators and mortality ===
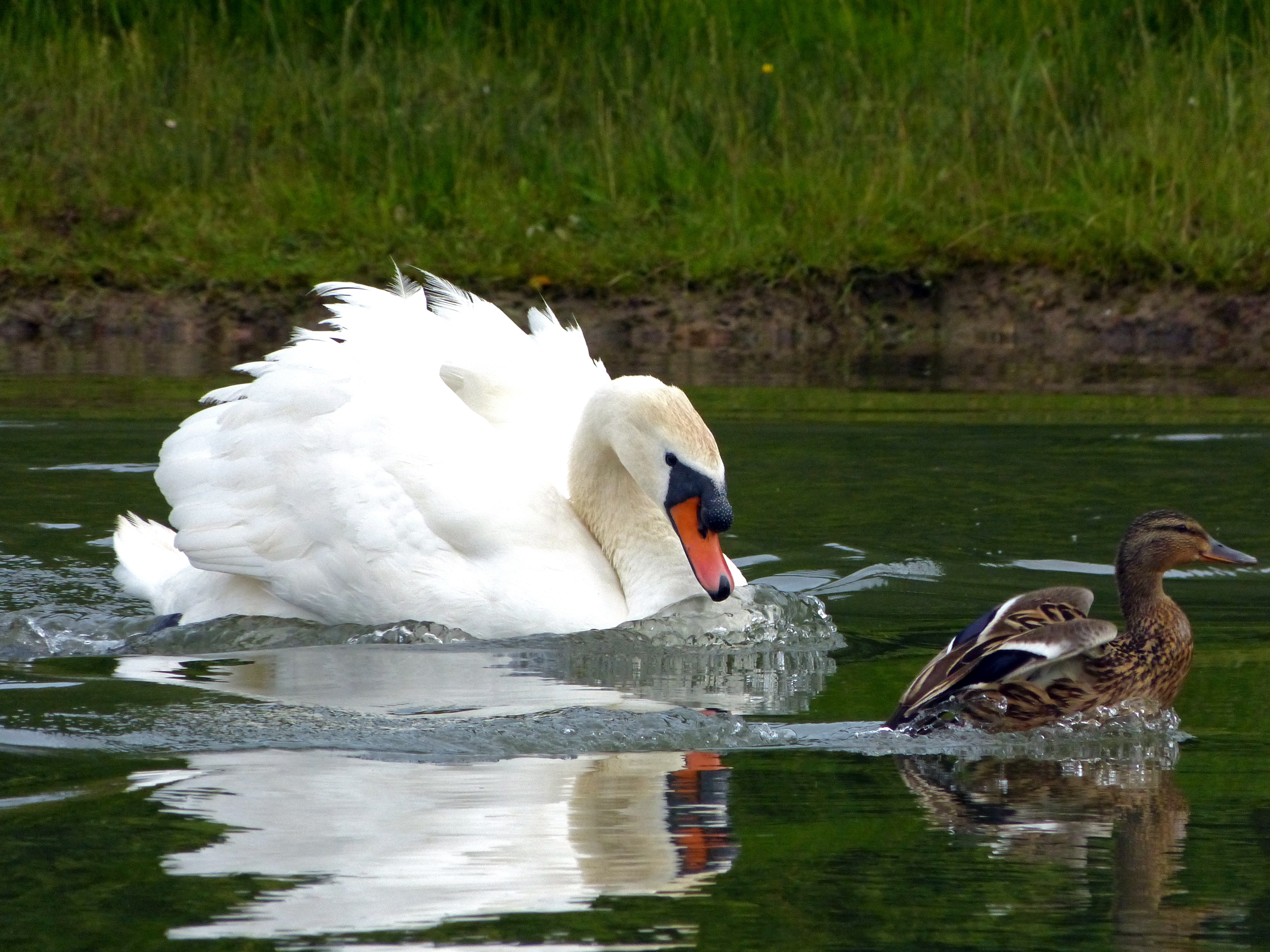
A swan defending its territory by attacking a mallard duck

In their native range, wild boars and corvids such as hooded crows take eggs of mute swan. Red foxes, northern pike, and invasive American minks occasionally prey on cygnets. In New York (outside of its native range), the most common predators of cygnets are common snapping turtles. The wings of the swan are very powerful, though not strong enough to break an adult man's leg, as is commonly misquoted. Nevertheless, they can and usually keep most predators at bay and even kill large predators such as red foxes.

Healthy adults are rarely preyed upon, though canids such as coyotes, felids, lynx, and bears can pose a threat to infirm ones (healthy adults can usually swim away from danger and nest defence is usually successful), and there are a few cases of healthy adults falling prey to the golden eagles.

Despite having few natural enemies, many mute swans die because of human activities. Collisions with power lines and lead poisoning are fatal to mute swans. In Great Britain, there has been an increased rate of attacks on swans by out-of-control dogs, especially in parks where the birds are less territorial. This is considered criminal in British law, and the birds are placed under the highest protection due to their association with the monarch. Mute swans will readily attack dogs to protect themselves and their cygnets from an attack, and an adult swan is capable of overwhelming and drowning even large dog breeds.

Like other swans, mute swans are known for their ability to grieve for a lost or dead mate or cygnet. Swans will go through a mourning process, and in the case of the loss of their mate, may either stay where their counterpart lived or fly off to join a flock. Should one of the pair die while there are cygnets present, the remaining parent will take up their partner's duties in raising the clutch.

== Distribution and habitat ==
The mute swan is found naturally mainly in temperate areas of Europe and across the Palearctic, as far east as Primorsky Krai, near Sidemi.

=== Habitat ===
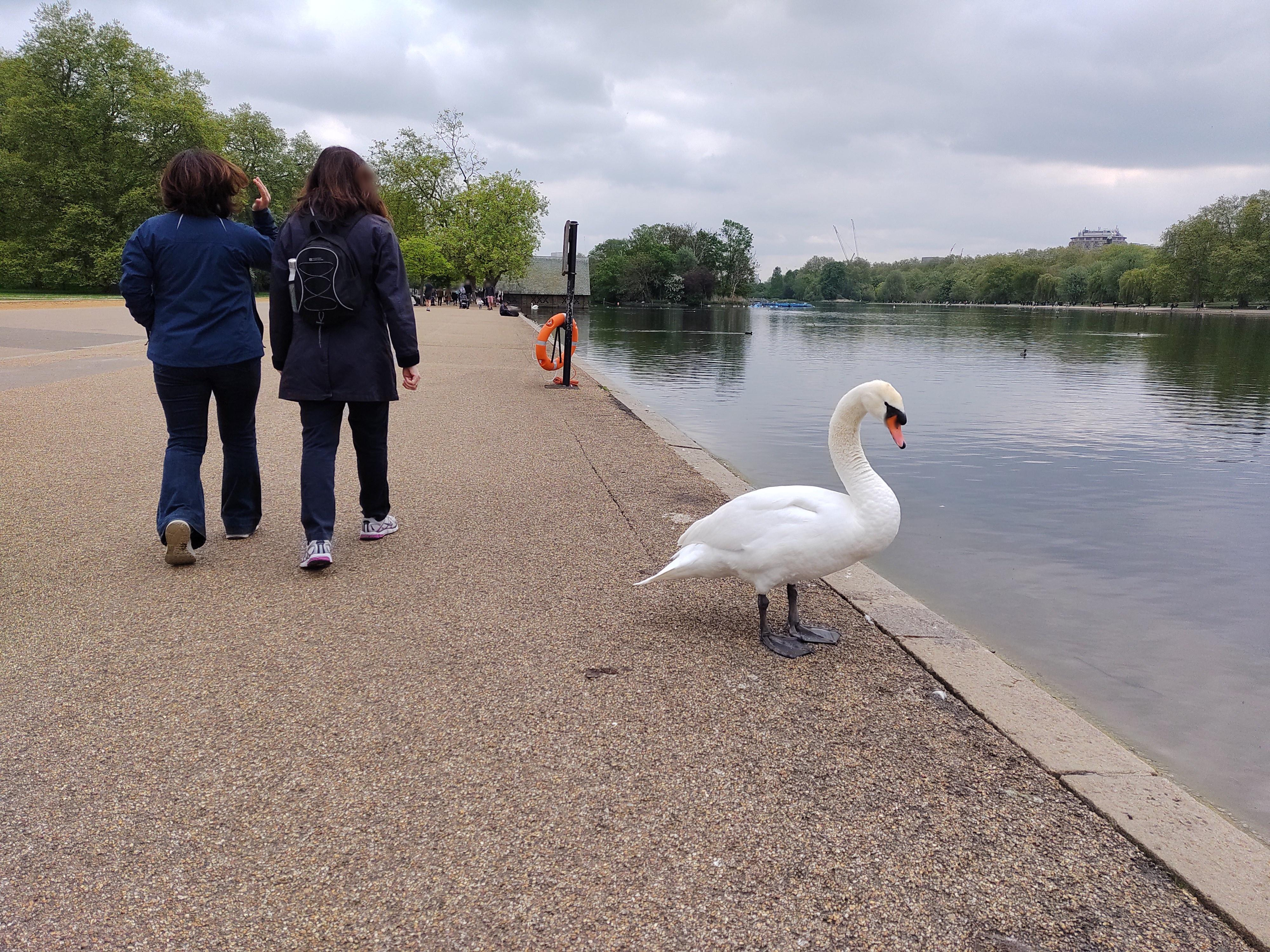
A mute swan in The Serpentine, Hyde Park, London

Mute swans generally inhabit various freshwater areas, including lagoons, lakes, and slow-flowing rivers, with a preference for medium to larger sized bodies of water. Outside of the breeding season, terrestrial habitats, in particular ones near water may also be used.

=== Migration ===
Mute swans migrate in small groups of varying size, parents and young will often move to wintering areas together. Birds breeding in Mongolia, eastern Russia, and China migrate thousands of kilometers south-east to their winter range along the lower Yellow River, western Yellow Sea, and the east coast of North Korea. This migration happens over a time span of 30–32 days. Many birds in West and Central Asia move south in winter to the shores of the Caspian Sea, as far as Iran and Afghanistan, more birds will move south during harsher winters. Mute swans nesting in the northern part of their range in Hungary, Ukraine, and Russia will often migrate to the Black Sea. Immature individuals are more likely to inhabit the northern Black Sea, while adults more frequently move to the south. Birds in Ireland, Britain, and northwestern and central Europe typically do not migrate, short movements may occur in the case of severe weather. In North America, the mute swan is largely sedentary or makes small distance movements affected by the severity of the weather.

=== World population ===
==== Native populations ====
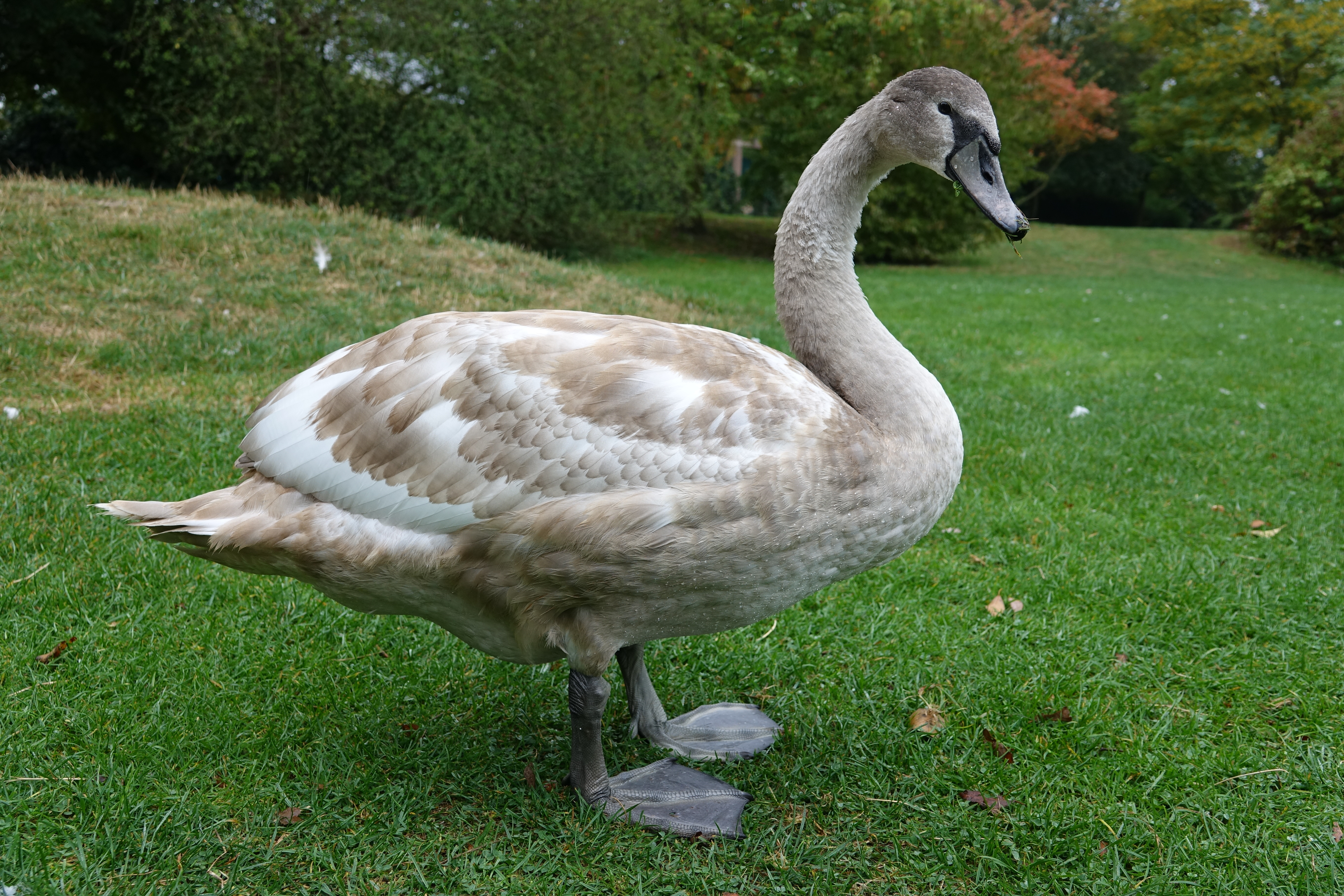
An older mute swan cygnet in Haut-Rhin, France, showing developing adult plumage and developed flight feathers on wings

The total native population of mute swans is about 500,000 birds at the end of the breeding season (adults plus young), of which up to 350,000 are in Russia. The largest single breeding concentration is represented by 11,000 pairs in the Volga Delta.

The population in the United Kingdom is about 22,000 birds as of the 2006–2007 winter, a slight decline from the peak of about 26,000–27,000 birds in 1990. This includes about 5,300 breeding pairs, the remainder being immatures. Other significant populations in Europe include 6,800–8,300 breeding pairs in Germany, 4,500 pairs in Denmark, 4,000–4,200 pairs in Poland, 3,000–4,000 pairs in the Netherlands, about 2,500 pairs in Ireland, and 1,200–1,700 pairs in Ukraine.

For many centuries, mute swans in Great Britain were domesticated for food, with individuals being marked by nicks on their webs (feet) or beaks to indicate ownership. These marks were registered with the Crown, and a Royal Swanherd was appointed. Any unmarked birds became the property of the Crown; hence the swan came to be known as the "Royal Bird". This domestication saved the mute swan from extirpation through overhunting in Great Britain.

Populations in Western Europe were largely exterminated by hunting pressure in the 13th–19th centuries, except for semi-domesticated birds maintained as poultry by large landowners. Better protection in the late 19th and early 20th centuries allowed the species to expand and return to most or all of their former range. More recently, from around 1960 to the early 1980s, numbers declined significantly once more in many parts of England, primarily as a result of lead poisoning caused by birds ingesting lead shot and discarded fishing weights made from lead. After lead weights and shot were mostly replaced by other less toxic alternatives, mute swan numbers increased again rapidly.

==== Introduced populations ====
Since its introduction to North America, the mute swan has expanded greatly in number and is now considered an invasive species in the region. Populations introduced into other areas remain small, with around 200 in Japan, fewer than 200 in New Zealand and Australia, and about 120 in South Africa.

===== North America =====
The mute swan was introduced to North America in the late 19th century. Recently, it has been widely viewed as an invasive species because of its rapidly increasing numbers and its adverse effects on other waterfowl and native ecosystems. For example, a study of population sizes in the lower Great Lakes from 1971 to 2000 found that mute swan numbers were increasing at an average rate of at least 10% per year, with the population doubling every seven to eight years. Several studies have concluded that mute swans severely reduce the density of submerged vegetation where they occur.

In 2003, the U.S. Fish and Wildlife Service proposed to "minimize environmental damages attributed to mute swans" by reducing their numbers in the Atlantic Flyway to pre-1986 levels, a 67% reduction at the time. According to a report published in the Federal Register of 2003, the proposal was supported by all thirteen state wildlife agencies that submitted comments, as well as by 43 bird conservation, wildlife conservation and wildlife management organisations. Ten animal rights organisations and the vast majority of comments from individuals were opposed. At this time, mute swans were protected under the Migratory Bird Treaty Act due to a court order, but in 2005 the United States Department of the Interior officially declared them a non-native, unprotected species. Mute swans are protected in some areas of the U.S. by local laws — for example, in Connecticut. However, the State of Connecticut recognizes that mute swans are an invasive species and are not specifically protected.

The status of the mute swan as an introduced species in North America is disputed by the interest group "Save the Mute Swans". They assert that mute swans are native to the region and, therefore, deserving of protection. They claim that mute swans had origins in Russia and cite historical sightings and fossil records. These claims have been rejected as specious by the U.S. Department of the Interior.

===== Oceania =====
The mute swan had absolute protection in New Zealand under the Wildlife Act 1953, but this was changed in June 2010 to a lower level of protection. It still has protection, but it may now be killed or held in captivity at the discretion of the Minister of Conservation.

A small feral population exists in the vicinity of Northam, near Perth in Western Australia. Numbering 80 in the 1980s, the colony had declined to around 10 individuals by 2015.

== In popular culture ==
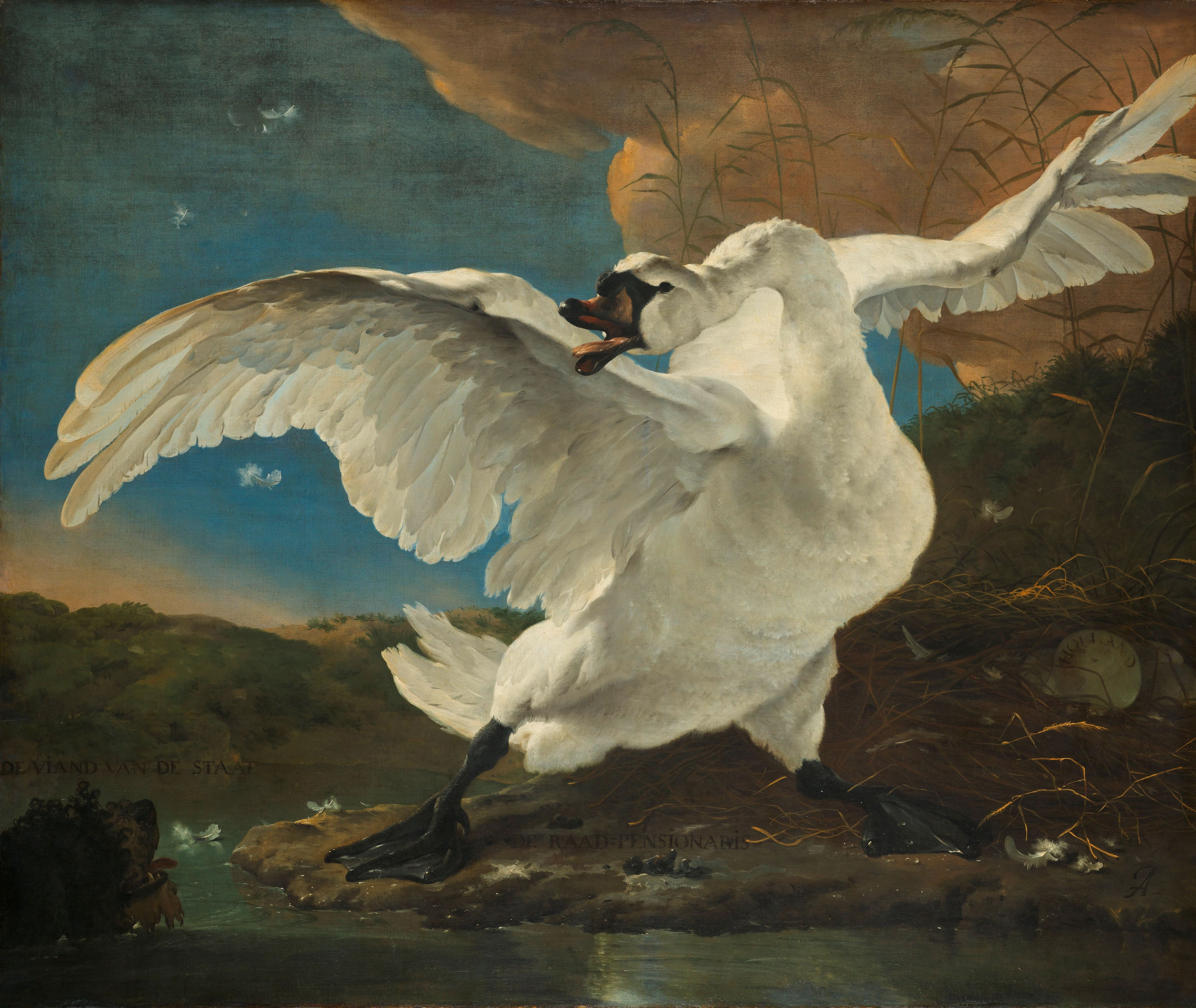
The Threatened Swan (c. 1650) by Jan Asselijn

The mute swan has been the national bird of Denmark since 1984. Before that, the skylark was considered Denmark's national bird (since 1960).

The fairy tale "The Ugly Duckling" by Hans Christian Andersen tells the story of a cygnet ostracised by his fellow barnyard fowl because of his perceived unattractiveness. To his delight (and to the surprise of others), he matures into a graceful swan, the most beautiful bird of all.

Today, the British Monarch retains the right to ownership of all unmarked mute swans in open water, but King Charles III exercises his ownership only on certain stretches of the Thames and its surrounding tributaries. This ownership is shared with the Vintners' and Dyers' Companies, who were granted rights of ownership by the Crown in the 15th century.

The mute swans in the moat at the Bishop's Palace, near Wells Cathedral in Wells, England, have for centuries been trained to ring bells using strings attached to them to beg for food. Two swans are still able to ring for lunch.

Romeo and Juliet, the pair of swans that reside in the Boston Public Garden, are named after the Shakespearean couple; however, it was found that both of them are females shortly after the legal recognition of same-sex marriage in Massachusetts.

While The Sydney Swans Football Club earned their nickname from the many players they recruited from Western Australia in the 1930s (the black swan being the State's Badge and Bird), the Football Club adopted the mute swan as their symbol as it matched their red and white team colours. The swan's plumage on the logo is designed to replicate the sails of the Sydney Opera House.

== See also ==
- The Bird of Peace (statue)
- Swan Upping
