= Swan mark =

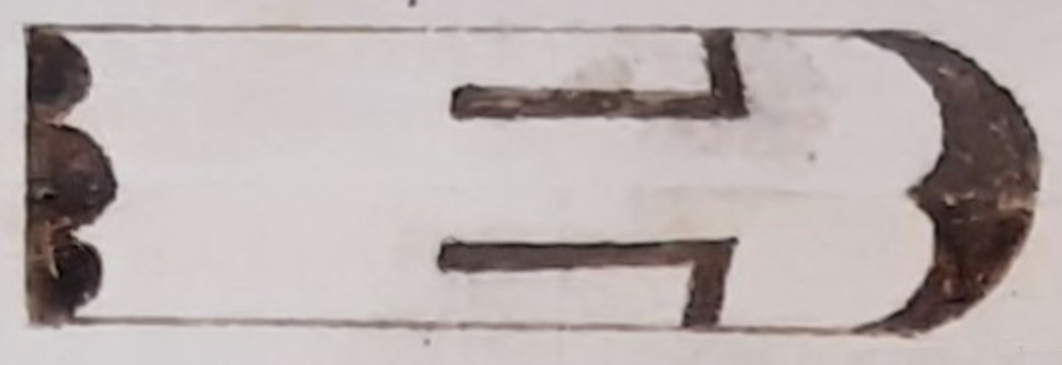
An English swan mark from 1638, granted to John Hobart of Weybread, Suffolk, indicating the design of notches to be etched or cut into the beaks of all swans owned by him

Swan marks in England were a variety of unique identifying notches made on the beaks of swans living and foraging at large on rivers, and elsewhere, in order to identify their official "owner" or keeper. Swans were royal birds, the property of the monarch, but ownership of flocks could be granted by royal deed to certain individuals, whose birds would then be marked with the appointed swan mark. The marks were designed and granted by signed and sealed deed by the "Master of his/her Majesty's Royal Game of all manner of swans and cygnets" for the county concerned. All unmarked swans on English rivers continue to be the property of the monarch, and the royal office of Marker of the Swans survives.

A deed dated 1638 survives, granted by John Duke, lord of the manor of Worlingham, Master of his Majesty's Royal Game in Suffolk and Essex, to John Hobart of Weybread, who owned land near Norwich and at Blickling both in Norfolk and in the Norfolk Broads. (Sir Henry Hobart of Blickling was the deputy Swan-Master for east Norfolk and Suffolk in 1625.)

The text states (with abbreviations expanded and modernised spelling):

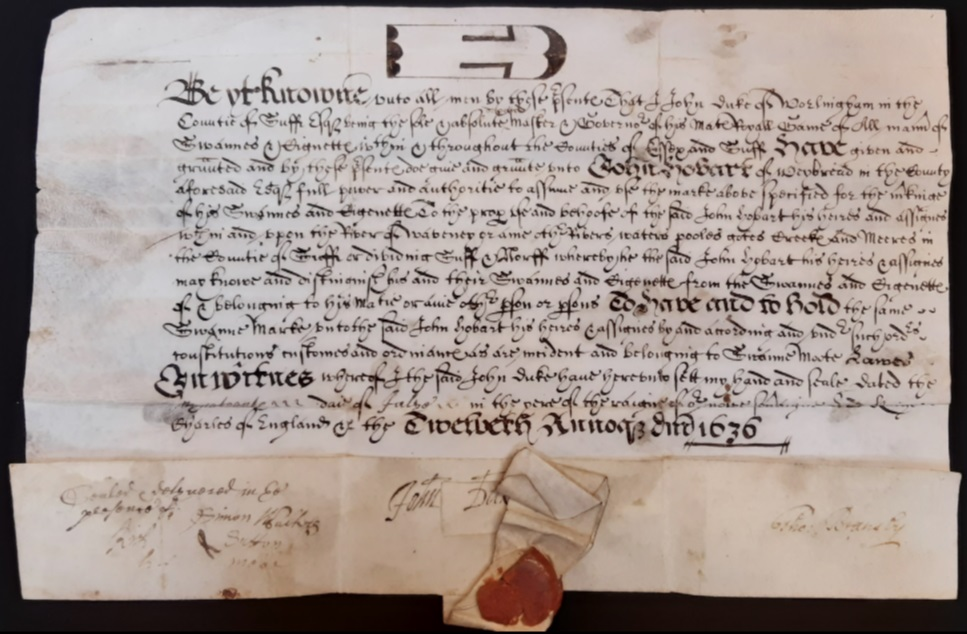
A deed dated 1638 granted to John Hobart of Weybread, Suffolk, by John Duke of Worlingham, Master of his Majesty's Royal Game in Suffolk and Essex, with the design of the mark drawn on top

Be it known unto all men by these presents that I, John Duke, of Worlingham in the county of Suffolk, Esquire, being the sole and absolute Master and Governor of his Majesty's royal game of all manner of swans and cygnets in this and throughout the counties of Essex and Suffolk, have given and granted, and by these presents do give and grant, unto John Hobart of Weybread in the county aforesaid, Esquire, full power and authority to assume and use the mark above specified for the marking of his swans and cygnets, the property, use, and behove of the said John Hobart, his heirs, and assigns within and upon the River of Waveney, or any other rivers, waters, pools, gulfs, creeks, and meres in the county of Suffolk or dividing Suffolk and Norfolk, whereby he, the said John Hobart, his heirs, and assigns, may know and distinguish his and their swans and cygnets from the swans and cygnets of and belonging to his Majesty or any other person or persons. To have and to hold the same swan mark unto the said John Hobart, his heirs, and assigns, by, and according, and under such orders, constitutions, customs, and ordinance as are evident and belonging to Swan Moot laws. In witness whereof I, the said John Duke, have hereunto set my hand and seal dated the nineteenth day of July in the year of the reign of our most sovereign King Charles of England the twelfth, Annoque Domini 1636.

Swans were royal birds, the property of the monarch, but from the 13th century the crown granted rights of ownership of swans to members of the public, with the flock of birds concerned being identifiable as the property of each grantee by a unique "swan mark" attributable to that person notched onto the beak of each swan in that person's ownership. The mark thus protected the grantee's birds from being taken to supply the royal dinner table, as was the potential fate of any unmarked swan found at large on a river within the kingdom. The officer responsible for awarding the swan marks and controlling their ownership was the "Master of his/her Majesty's Game of Swans", who had officers serving under him to look after wild swans and cygnets in a specified area. The varieties of different swan marks granted were recorded in a "register of swan marks" or "roll of swan marks", akin to a roll of arms.

Fully digitised, detailed records of some swan marks are available courtesy of the British Library in Add MS 44986.

== See also ==
- Bird ringing
