= The Woofits =

Book series by Michael Parkinson

The Woofits' Day Out
- Author: Michael Parkinson
- Language: English
- Series: The Woofits
- Genre: Juvenile fiction
- Published: London: Collins, 1980
- Publication place: United Kingdom
- Pages: 48
- ISBN: 9780001235267
- OCLC: 16498491
- Followed by: The Woofits Play Cricket

The Woofits Play Cricket
- Author: Michael Parkinson
- Language: English
- Series: The Woofits
- Genre: Juvenile fiction
- Published: London: Collins, 1980
- Publication place: United Kingdom
- Pages: 48
- ISBN: 9780001235274
- OCLC: 16498494
- Preceded by: The Woofits' Day Out
- Followed by: The Woofits Play Football

The Woofits Play Football
- Author: Michael Parkinson
- Language: English
- Series: The Woofits
- Genre: Juvenile fiction
- Published: London: Collins, 1980
- Publication place: United Kingdom
- Pages: 48
- ISBN: 9780001235281
- OCLC: 16498497
- Preceded by: The Woofits Play Cricket
- Followed by: The 'Daily Woofit'

The 'Daily Woofit'
- Author: Michael Parkinson
- Language: English
- Series: The Woofits
- Genre: Juvenile fiction
- Published: London: Collins, 1980
- Publication place: United Kingdom
- Pages: 48
- ISBN: 9780001235298
- OCLC: 16498488
- Preceded by: The Woofits Play Football

The Woofits is a series of children's books written in the 1980s by British television and radio personality Michael Parkinson, best known for his TV chat shows.

The stories featured the Woofits, a family of anthropomorphic dog-like creatures who lived in the fictional Yorkshire coal mining village of Grimeworth (based on the real life Cudworth where Parkinson was born and nearby village of Grimethorpe). Most of the inhabitants of Grimeworth were Woofits (and had the surname "Woofit"), although humans also appeared in the stories.

== Books ==
The four original books published in 1980 by Collins of London were

- The Woofits Day Out
- The Woofits Play Cricket
- The Woofits Play Football
- The Daily Woofit

In addition there were Woofit annuals for the years 1980, 1981, 1982 and 1983.

In some of the annuals the setting for the stories was moved from Grimeworth to Batley in West Yorkshire where the Woofits worked at a woollen mill and were of Scottish origin.

== Television ==
In 1981 Yorkshire Television made two series of Woofits cartoons to be shown on ITV's lunchtime slot for young children based on the original stories and new stories with Michael Parkinson narrating them.

- Series 1: 6 episodes - 30 April 1981 – 4 June 1981
- Series 2: 12 episodes -11 February 1982 – 29 April 1982

== Characters ==
The main members of the Woofit family lived in 3 terraced houses along Grimeworth Street, Grimeworth these were -

Number 8

- Grandpa Ironside and Grandma Emily, the heads of the family

Number 10

- Uncle Athelstone, miner, gardener and bandleader of Grimeworth Colliery brass band
- Uncle Gaylord, Athelstone's brother a football pools winner who considered himself posh.

Number 12

- John Willy Woofit, son of Ironside and coal miner and played the trombone in the brass band
- Lavina, wife of John Willy
- Elton, son of Lavinia and John Willy, dreamed of being a pop star.
- Angela, sister of Elton who had ambitions to be a TV newsreader
- Elton's pet dog Gershwin

Other characters included Baskerville Woofit (editor of the Daily Woofit), Cluff Woofit (manager of the local football team) and local policeman Sergeant Fox.
