= Michael Parkinson =

English television and radio personality (1935–2023)

Sir Michael Parkinson CBE
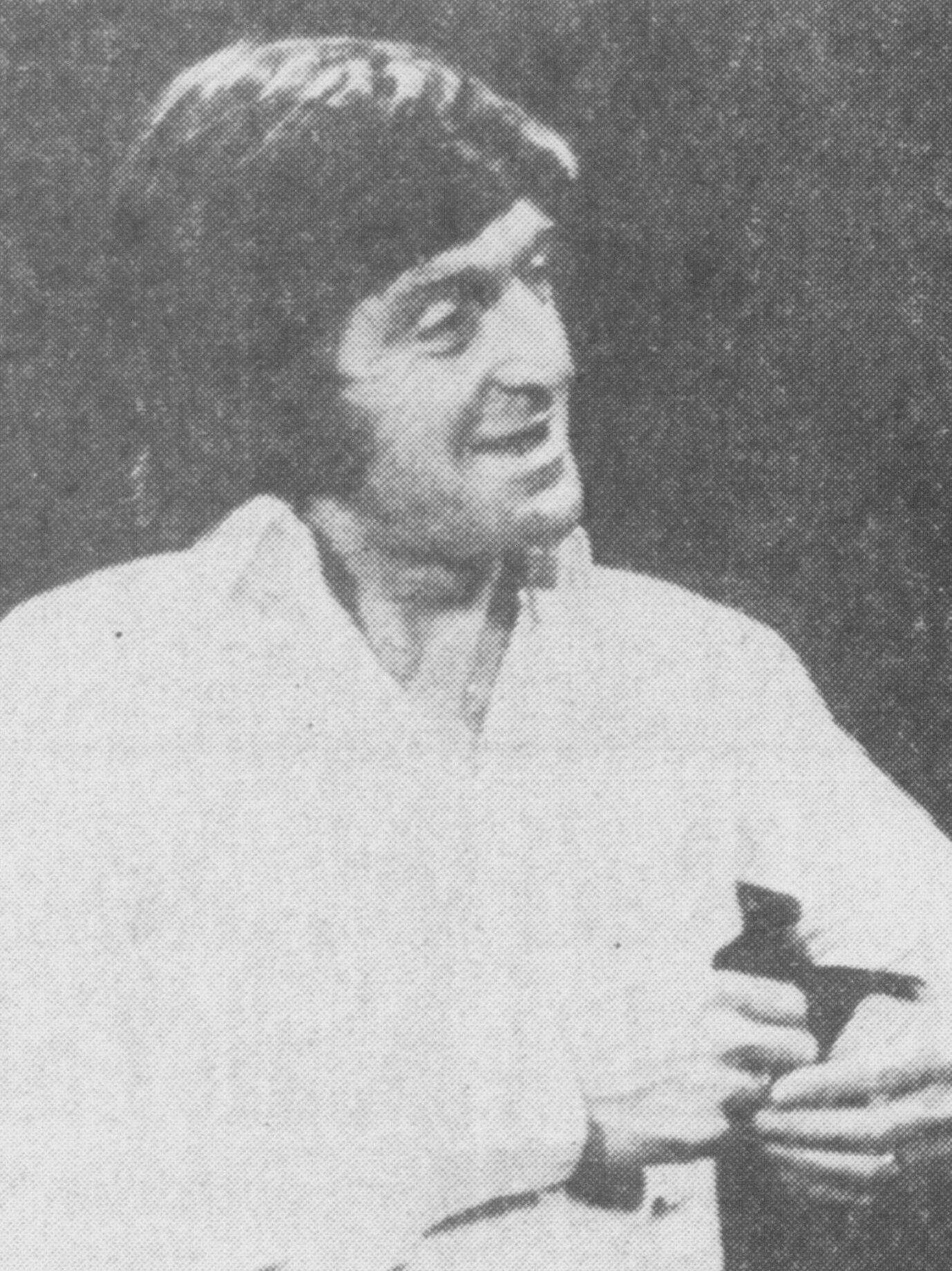
- Parkinson in 1972
- Born: 28 March 1935; Cudworth, West Riding of Yorkshire, England
- Died: 16 August 2023 (aged 88); Bray, Berkshire, England
- Occupations: Television presenter; radio presenter; author; journalist
- Years active: 1966–2023
- Television: Parkinson (1971‍–‍1982, 1998‍–‍2007)
- Spouse: Mary Heneghan (m. 1959)
- Children: 3
- Awards: Knight Bachelor (2008)
- Website: Official website

Sir Michael Parkinson (28 March 1935 – 16 August 2023) was an English television presenter, broadcaster, journalist and author. He presented his television talk show Parkinson from 1971 to 1982 and from 1998 to 2007, as well as other talk shows and programmes both in the UK and abroad. He also worked in radio and was described by The Guardian as "the great British talkshow host".

== Early life ==
Michael Parkinson was born on 28 March 1935 in the village of Cudworth, in Barnsley. The son of a miner, he was educated at Barnsley Grammar School after passing the eleven-plus and in 1951 passed two O-Levels: in art and English language. He was a club cricketer and both he and his opening partner at Barnsley Cricket Club, Dickie Bird, had trials for Yorkshire together with Geoffrey Boycott. He once kept Boycott out of the Barnsley Cricket Club team by scoring a century and 50 in two successive matches. A young Michael Parkinson World XI played at the Scarborough Festival between 1988 and 1990.

Parkinson began his career as a journalist on local newspapers straight after leaving school. He worked as a features writer for the Manchester Guardian, working alongside Michael Frayn and later on the Daily Express in London. In the course of his two years' National Service, which began in July 1955, he received a commission as an officer in the Royal Army Pay Corps, becoming the youngest captain in the British Army at the time. He saw active service in Egypt in the Suez Crisis as a British Army press liaison officer.

== Career ==
=== Television ===
During the 1960s, Parkinson moved into television, working on current-affairs programmes for the BBC and Manchester-based Granada Television. He was one of the presenters on the five-times-a-week news show Twenty-Four Hours on BBC1 from March 1966 until January 1968. From 1969 he presented Granada's Cinema, a late-night film review programme, before in July 1971 presenting his BBC series Parkinson, which ran until April 1982 and from January 1998 until December 2007, leaving the BBC for ITV1 midway through the second run, which concluded after 31 series. By his own reckoning, he had interviewed 2,000 of the world's celebrities. Parkinson was one of the original "Famous Five" line-up of TV-am's Good Morning, Britain in 1983, with Angela Rippon, Anna Ford, David Frost and Robert Kee. Parkinson presented the weekend edition of the programme until February 1984.

He also took over as host of Thames Television's Give Us a Clue from Michael Aspel from 1984, while in 1985, he stood in for Barry Norman as presenter of Film 85.

In 1987 and 1988, Parkinson hosted fifteen episodes of Parkinson One to One for Yorkshire Television, a series of interview programmes which continued in the style of his BBC talk show but with each episode dedicated to a single celebrity guest.

On Halloween 1992, Parkinson appeared as himself in the television drama Ghostwatch as the studio link during a fictional, apparently live, paranormal investigation. However, the cinéma vérité style in which it was shot led to complaints from viewers who believed it depicted real events. From 1995 to 1999, he hosted the BBC One daytime programme Going for a Song. He again appeared as himself in Richard Curtis's 2003 romantic comedy film, Love Actually, interviewing the character Billy Mack, played by Bill Nighy. In October 2003, Parkinson had a controversial interview with Meg Ryan while she was in the UK to promote In the Cut, which he called his most difficult television moment.

On 26 June 2007, Parkinson announced his retirement:

After three enjoyable and productive years at ITV, and after 25 years of doing my talk show I have decided that this forthcoming series will be my last. I'm going to take next year off to write my autobiography and consider other television projects. My thanks go out to all those who have worked on the shows down the years and the viewers for their loyal support and occasional kind words.

In 2007, Parkinson appeared in the Australian soap Neighbours as himself. On 24 November 2007, during recording of the final regular edition of his ITV chat show, broadcast on 16 December, Parkinson fought back tears as he was given an ovation. On 'PARKINSON The Final Conversation' his guests were: Billy Connolly, Sir Michael Caine, David Attenborough, David Beckham, Jamie Cullum, Peter Kay, Dame Judi Dench & Dame Edna Everage. By December 2008 Parkinson held 458 credits as a presenter on his own and with others.

Parkinson was a flagship of the BBC's prime-time schedule, attracting top names before the chat show circuit was part of the promotional mill. He was able to interview wartime variety stars while attracting up-and-coming comedians such as Billy Connolly. He was not afraid to allow an interviewee time to be themself, sometimes, as with Fred Astaire, Orson Welles, Alec Guinness, Paul McCartney, Muhammad Ali, George Michael, Madonna, John Cleese and Mel Gibson, devoting an entire programme to a guest who was considered especially noteworthy. Parkinson stated that "If I could save one interview from the thousands I have done, it would be the one-man show with Professor Jacob Bronowski."

He stated that the most remarkable man he ever interviewed was Muhammad Ali, and regretted never interviewing Frank Sinatra or Don Bradman.

Parkinson returned to hosting television in November 2012 with his new show Parkinson: Masterclass on Sky Arts.

=== Radio ===
Parkinson took over BBC Radio 4's Desert Island Discs for the 1986 series after the 1985 death of its creator, Roy Plomley, whose widow was unhappy with Parkinson replacing him. After six shows, he was criticised by the BBC Board of Management for "a Yorkshire bias in the choice of castaways" despite the fact that only one of his guests was born in the county. Parkinson claimed that the criticism was "a rearguard action by the establishment against the perceived desecration of an institution by an outsider". Parkinson stayed for two years until handing duties over to Sue Lawley.

Between 1994 and 1996 he hosted Parkinson on Sport on BBC Radio 5 Live. Between 1996 and 2007, he presented a morning show on BBC Radio 2 called Parkinson's Sunday Supplement; it featured newspaper and entertainment summaries with the help of journalists and a lengthy interview with a media personality. These were interspersed with music that demonstrated his penchant for jazz and big band. In October 2007, a few months after announcing his retirement from his television series, Parkinson said his radio show would also end. The last programme was broadcast on Sunday 2 December 2007. Parkinson presented a mid-morning programme on London's LBC Newstalk 97.3FM. He was considered responsible for the promotion of jazz singers to a more mainstream audience during the run of his BBC radio show.

=== Writing ===
Parkinson's first article for The Sunday Times Colour Section, "Living in a Museum" (about the Suffolk village of Lavenham), appeared on 8 July 1962. In 1965, The Sunday Times invited him to write a regular sports column, drawing on characters from his days in cricket and football. Parkinson authored numerous books, including Cricket Mad and Football Daft, which included pieces written for The Sunday Times pieces and his articles for Punch magazine. He wrote a biography of George Best, titled Best: An Intimate Biography, published in 1975. In the 1980s, he wrote a series of children's books called The Woofits about a family of anthropomorphic dog-like creatures in the fictional Yorkshire coal-mining village of Grimeworth. The books led to a TV series, which he narrated. He wrote a sports column for The Daily Telegraph and was president of the Sports Journalists' Association.

His autobiography, Parky, was published on 2 October 2008 by Hodder & Stoughton. In April 2009, Parkinson wrote about the recently deceased Jade Goody in the Radio Times and described her as "barely educated, ignorant and puerile", adding: "When we clear the media smokescreen from around her death, what we're left with is a woman who came to represent all that's paltry and wretched about Britain today." Bishop Jonathan Blake, who had presided over Goody's wedding, took exception to Parkinson's comments. He published a second book on George Best, George Best: A Memoir, in 2019. The subject of his family was explored in Like Father, Like Son: A family story, published in 2020.

=== Other work ===
In 1971, Parkinson was nominated as a candidate for the position of Rector of the University of Dundee. In one of the closest-ever contests for that position, he was very narrowly defeated by incumbent Peter Ustinov after two recounts. The result was controversial, as it was alleged earlier results indicated Parkinson had won and a further recount should have taken place to confirm the result. As a result, pressure grew for the poll to be rerun. While the university decreed that the original result was to stand, a new poll was organised by the Students' Association, which also featured the candidature of a goat. However, this time Ustinov won a decisive victory over Parkinson, the goat and Paul Foot.

Parkinson is on the cover of the 1973 Paul McCartney and Wings album Band on the Run. Paul McCartney told Parkinson that he would appear on his show if Parkinson appeared on the album cover, although it was not until 1999 that McCartney fulfilled his promise.

In 2005, Parkinson appeared with comedian Peter Kay on the music video of the re-released "Is This the Way to Amarillo" for Comic Relief, which became a number one single.

On 29 September 2008, Parkinson launched his website, which included online interviews. The site also includes a blog, giving Parkinson's views on news events as well as information about his compilation album, Michael Parkinson: My Life in Music, featuring favourite songs performed by Frank Sinatra, Michael Bublé, Dionne Warwick and others.

Parkinson gave the keynote address in Sydney on Australia Day 2011, the first non-Australian to do so. Parkinson used the publicity surrounding his Australia Day appearance to promote the abolition of the Australian monarchy.

After finishing his talk show, Parkinson appeared in commercials for SunLife Guaranteed Over 50 Plan life insurance, stating that he liked "its no-nonsense approach to business". His role in advertising the scheme was criticised by financial journalist Martin Lewis, who argued in 2012 that the plan was "poor value" for customers.

== Views ==
Parkinson was a critic of the apartheid system governing South Africa until the 1990s and wrote a monthly sports column for Anti-Apartheid News, the official newspaper of the Anti-Apartheid Movement, upon its launch in 1965. He was particularly vocal on the topic of accommodating the wishes of the apartheid government in the sphere of international cricket, accusing the Marylebone Cricket Club (MCC) of being "racialists of the worst kind" in his Sunday Times column for initially excluding the South African-born mixed-race England cricketer Basil D'Oliveira from the England team touring South Africa in 1968–69. He also opposed a planned South African tour of England in 1970, characterising the MCC's defence of the tour as "a rag-bag of cliche, red herring, zig-zagging, bobbing and weaving", and judging their justification of it as having "all the watertight qualities of a string bag". He went on to write the foreword to Colin Shindler's history of the campaign against the 1970 tour, Barbed Wire and Cucumber Sandwiches. He was also a founding sponsor of the Anti-Nazi League in 1977.

In 2009, Parkinson bemoaned the state of television generally, saying in a Radio Times interview that he was "fed up with the rise of celebrities hosting shows, ridiculously titled documentaries and property shows", and also saying: "In my television paradise there would be no more property programmes, no more police-chasing-yobbos-in-cars programmes and, most of all and please God, no more so-called documentary shows with titles like My 20-Ton Tumour, My Big Fat Head, Wolf Girl, Embarrassing Illnesses and The Fastest Man on No Legs." On 11 October 2010, Parkinson appeared on Richard Bacon's BBC Radio 5 Live show, and was particularly critical of comedian and actor Russell Brand, saying: "I don't see the point of him."

In 2013, Parkinson again criticised the course British television had taken, comparing series such as The One Show unfavourably with the broadcasting of the recently deceased Alan Whicker and David Frost, as well as stating the "cult of youth" had "distorted the standards". Parkinson spoke fondly of the time when "producers were unencumbered by such irksome obstacles as compliance, health and safety and frustrating commissioning procedures". Alex Jones, presenter of The One Show, rejected Parkinson's criticism.

In August 2014, Parkinson was one of 200 public figures who were signatories to a letter to The Guardian expressing their hope that Scotland would vote to remain part of the United Kingdom in September's referendum on that issue.

Parkinson had declined to apologise to Helen Mirren over an interview he conducted in 1975, where he implied that serious actors could not have large breasts. Mirren later described him as a "sexist old fart". On Piers Morgan's Life Stories in May 2019, Morgan suggested the comments were sexist. Parkinson replied: "Well, maybe. But nobody got hurt, nobody died."

== Personal life, illness and death ==
On 22 August 1959, he married Mary Heneghan, who was from Doncaster. They had three children. His daughter-in-law was comedian and actress Fiona Allen. In the 1970s, Parkinson campaigned in support of birth control, having had a vasectomy in 1972 to allow his wife to stop taking oral contraceptive pills.

Parkinson was a cricket fan and in 1990 hosted a World XI team against Yorkshire. Parkinson and his wife lived in Bray, Berkshire. He met his friend Michel Roux when rowing down the River Thames on a Sunday to The Waterside Inn, then owned by Roux. Parkinson acquired a Michelin-starred restaurant near his home in Berkshire in 2001. In an interview with Irish broadcaster Gay Byrne on the RTÉ religious programme The Meaning of Life, he stated that he was an agnostic atheist.

A resident of Thames Valley, Parkinson was a patron of the local animal charity Swan Lifeline that rescues and treats swans and waterfowl, supporting the cause by attending lunches to raise awareness and money for the charity.

In 2010, the National Portrait Gallery acquired a painted portrait of Parkinson, which it had commissioned from the artist Jonathan Yeo, for its permanent collection.

In 2013, Parkinson announced that he had been diagnosed with prostate cancer. In 2015 he was given the all-clear from the disease.

Parkinson died at home on 16 August 2023 following a brief illness, aged 88.

== Honours and awards ==
In 1999, he received an honorary doctorate from the University of Lincoln and he also received an honorary D.Litt. from the University of Huddersfield in 2008. He was invested as a Commander of the Order of the British Empire (CBE) by Prince Charles in November 2000 for services to broadcasting, awarded in the 2000 Birthday Honours. Parkinson was made a Knight Bachelor in the 2008 New Year's Honours List; he remarked that he was "not the type to get a knighthood" coming as he did "from Barnsley. They give it to anyone nowadays."

Parkinson was ranked eighth in a list of the 100 Greatest British Television Programmes drawn up by the British Film Institute in 2000, voted for by industry professionals. In April 2006, Parkinson was awarded honorary patronage of the University Philosophical Society of Trinity College Dublin. He was voted number 20 in ITV's "TV's 50 Greatest Stars". On 4 June 2008 he was knighted by Queen Elizabeth II at Buckingham Palace.

On 11 November 2008, he became the first Chancellor of Nottingham Trent University; the role included representing the university and conferring degrees at graduation ceremonies. Upon receiving the honour he said, "I am honoured to be offered the chancellorship at Nottingham Trent University. In television I have always worked with young, ambitious people and I am keen to be involved in this university which helps to realise the aspirations of the young. It will also give me an opportunity to see what I missed!". He served in this role until 2014. Parkinson had served as president of the Sports Journalists' Association of Great Britain since 2005, the largest national organisation of sports journalists in the world.
