= Marker of the Swans =

Office in the Royal Household of the Sovereign of the United Kingdom

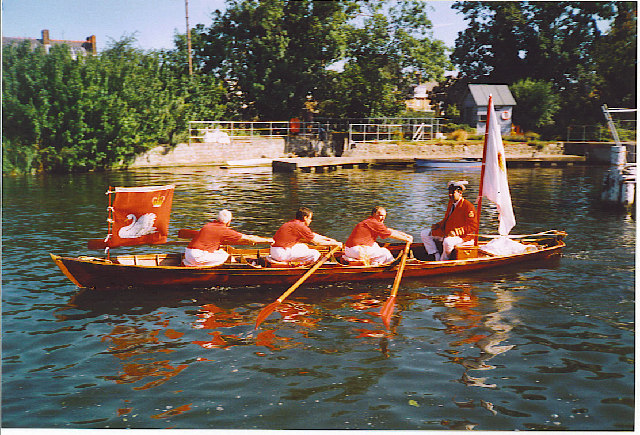
The Queen's Swan Marker being rowed in a skiff at the start of Swan Upping

Marker of the Swans, or Swan Marker, is an office in the Royal Household of the Sovereign of the United Kingdom. The role is related to monitoring and counting of swans found within the British Isles. It is a historic position that dates back to the Plantagenet period in medieval England.

== History ==
The role of Marker of the Swans dates back to the twelfth century. Although subsequent centuries the title has changed from Master, Keeper, and in 1993, to Swan Marker. The new post of Swan Warden was also created at this time.

== Role ==
The King's Swan Marker still organises the annual event of Swan Upping on the River Thames.

Apart from Swan Upping, The King's Swan Marker has other duties. He advises organisations throughout the country about swan welfare and incidents involving swans, he monitors the health of the local swan population and advises fishing and boating organisations how to work with wildlife. The King's Swan Marker works closely with swan rescue organisations and supervises the rescue of sick and injured swans. He also co-ordinates the removal of swans from stretches of the River Thames used for summer rowing regattas.

== Holders ==
The current office-holder is David Barber, MVO, appointed in 1993. Barber is a boat engine merchant by occupation.

== See also ==
- Swan mark
