= Swan upping =

Annual ceremony on the River Thames

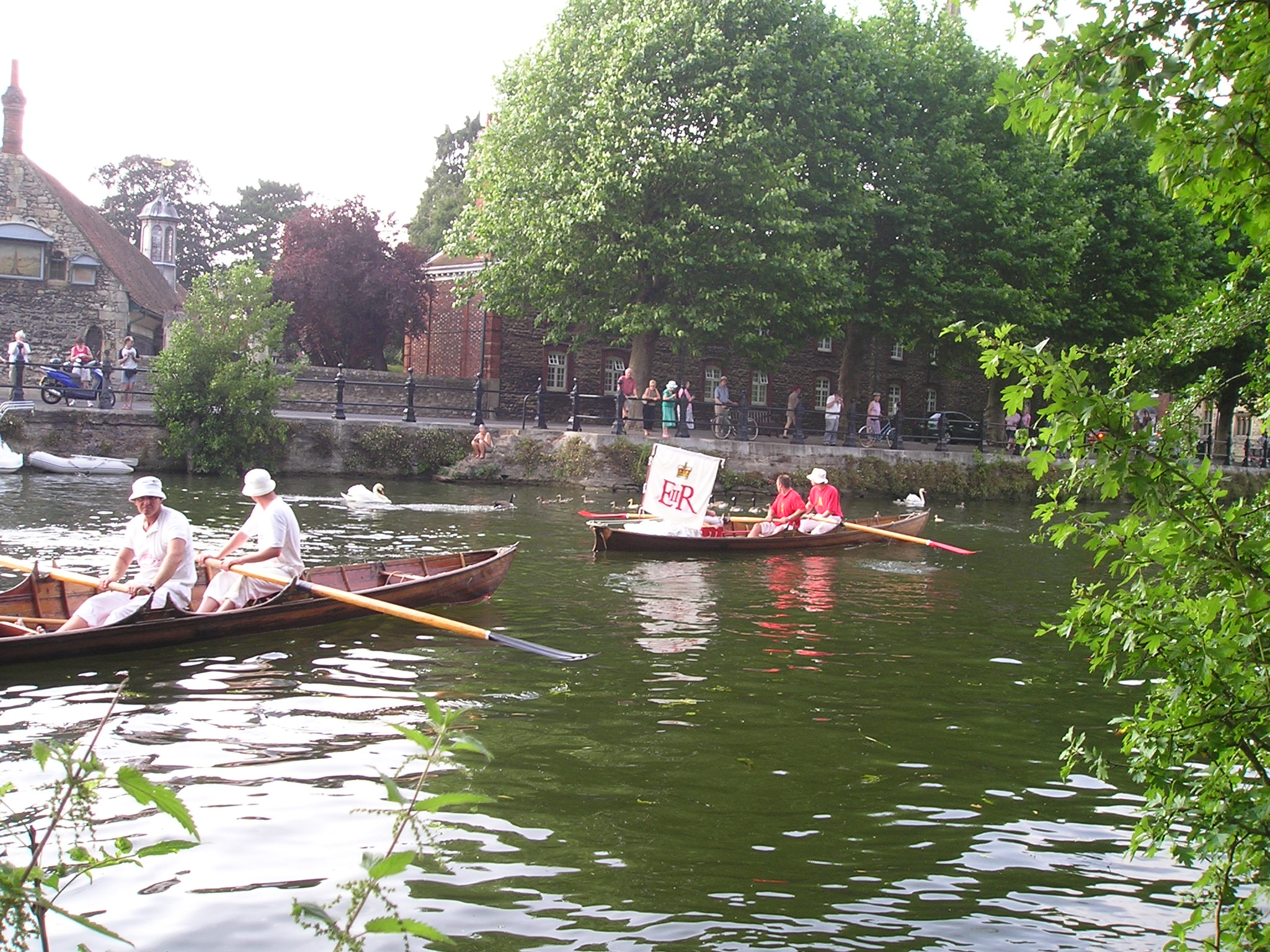
The Queen's swan uppers (right) and the Vintners' swan uppers (left), on the Thames at Abingdon, 2006

Swan upping is an annual ceremony in England in which mute swans on the River Thames are rounded up, caught, ringed, and then released.

== History ==
By prerogative right, the British Crown enjoys ownership of all unmarked mute swans in open water. Rights over swans may, however, be granted to a British subject by the Crown (accordingly they may also be claimed by prescription). Until the 16th century, the ownership of swans in a given body of water was commonly granted to landowners. The only bodies who still exercise such rights are two livery companies of the City of London, the Worshipful Company of Vintners and the Worshipful Company of Dyers, who thus share equally with the Crown in the number of swans in the Thames that they own. The tradition of swan upping on the Thames began in the 12th century.

== Description ==
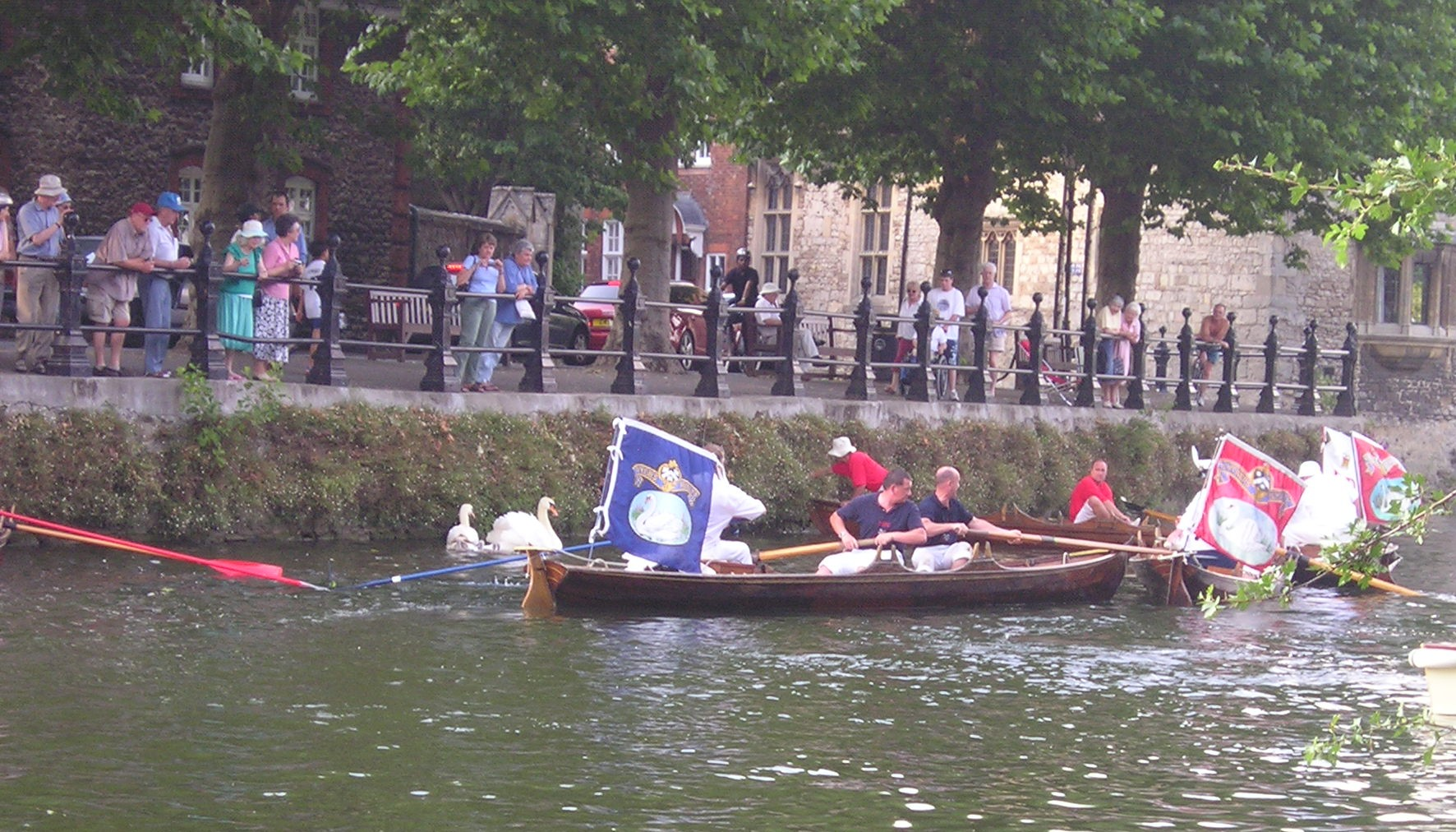
The skiffs surround the swans so that they can be more easily caught.

Swan upping is the traditional means by which the swans on the Thames are apportioned among the three proprietors. Its main practical purposes today are to conduct a census of swans and check their health. It occurs annually in the third week of July. Over five days, the Crown's, the Vintners' and the Dyers' respective 'swan uppers' row up the river in skiffs (in recent centuries from Sunbury to Abingdon).

The Crown's swans are recorded by the Marker of the Swans, who is rowed in a skiff by oarsmen from the Company of Watermen and Lightermen. The Crown's swan uppers, who wear distinctive red uniforms, catch the swans, weigh and measure the cygnets, and check them for injuries.

Based on their parentage, cygnets are determined to belong to the Crown, the Dyers or the Vintners. Swans belonging to the Crown are left unmarked, except for a lightweight ring linked to the database of the British Trust for Ornithology. Those belonging to the Dyers and Vintners receive a similar ring on the other leg. The rings have replaced nicks on the swans' bills, which used to be made with a metal implement, one nick for the Dyers and one on each side for the Vintners. The former practice is reflected in The Swan with Two Necks, the name of a former pub in the City connected with the Vintners, which was a corruption of "The Swan with Two Nicks".

== Seigneur of the Swans ==
Seigneur of the Swans

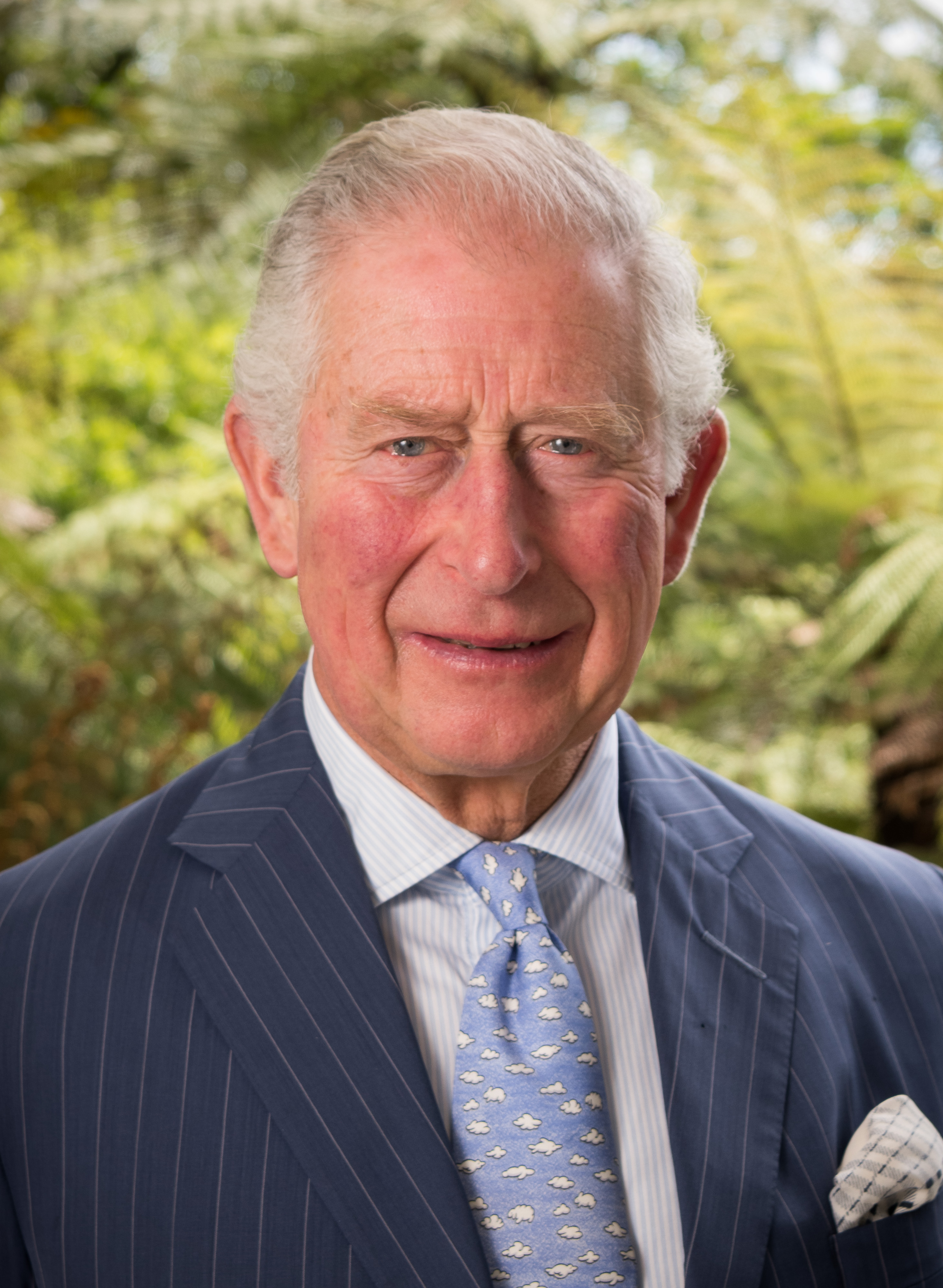
- Incumbent; Charles III; King of the United Kingdom
- Type: Position held by the British Monarch
- Formation: c. 12th Century

Seigneur of the Swans is a title of the British Monarch in regard to swan upping in England. The title has stood for centuries and reflects the monarch’s prerogative of ownership of all unmarked mute swans in open water.

The present holder is King Charles III.

Two officers are charged with carrying out this responsibility on behalf of the monarch, the Warden of the Swans and the Marker of the Swans, both offices of the royal household. Before 1993 both positions were one position of the Keeper of the King's/Queen's Swans.

The Marker of the Swans and King’s swan uppers all wear the royal cypher of the current monarch on their uniform.

On 20 July 2009, Queen Elizabeth II, as Seigneur of the Swans, attended the Swan Upping ceremony, the first time a reigning monarch personally attended.

== Cancellations ==
In 2012, exceptionally high river flows for the summer prompted a partial cancellation of swan upping between Sunbury and Windsor, the first time the tradition is known to have been cancelled (albeit partially).

The first known full cancellation took place in 2020 due to COVID-19 social distancing measures.

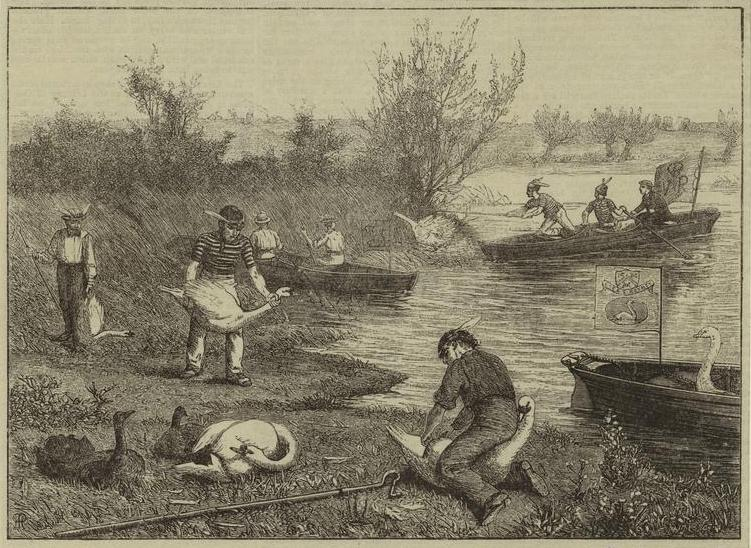
"Swan Upping on the Thames", from Henry Robert Robertson's Life on the Upper Thames, (1875)

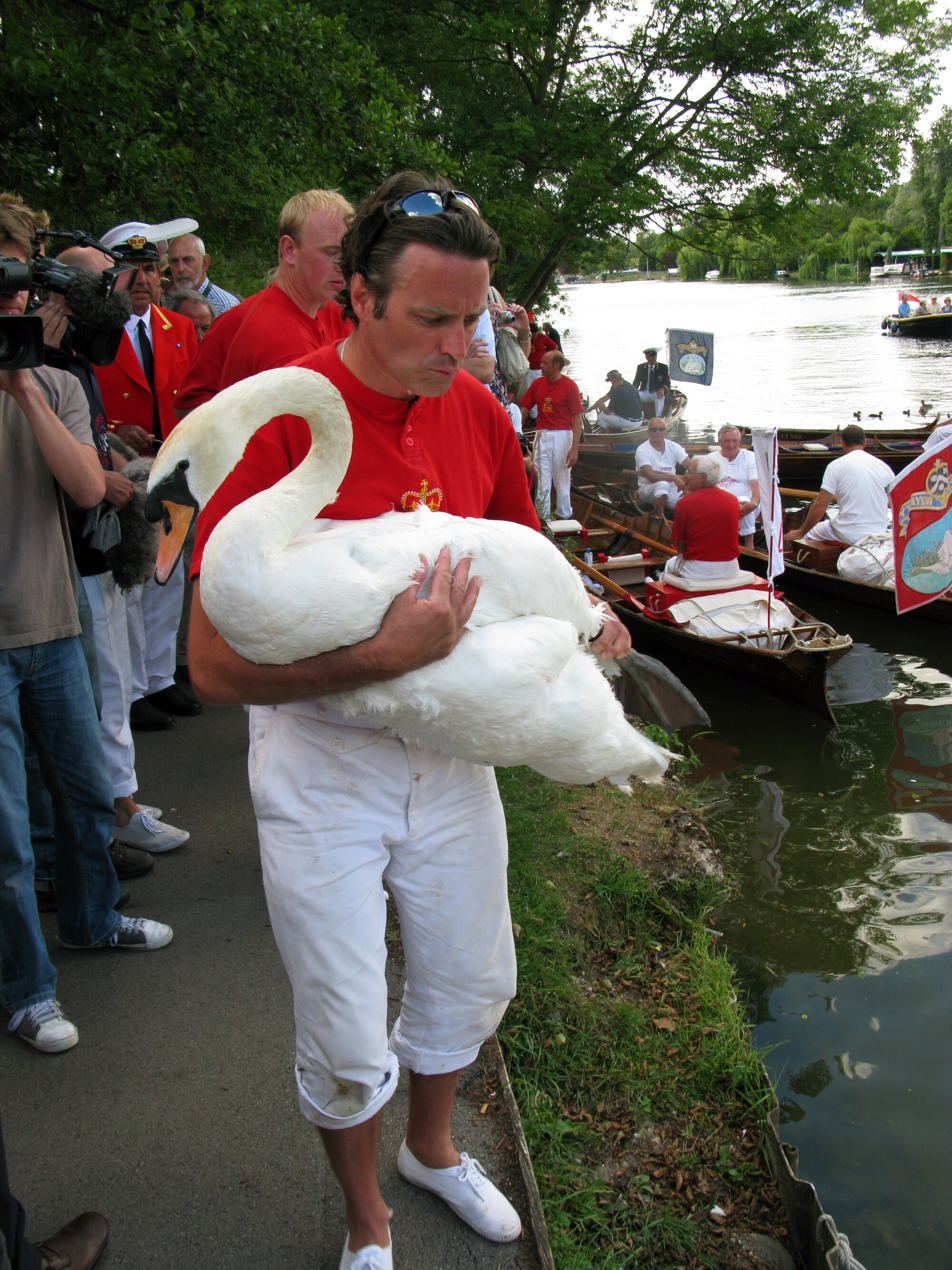
A Queen's swan upper with a mute swan during 2010 swan upping at Henley-on-Thames

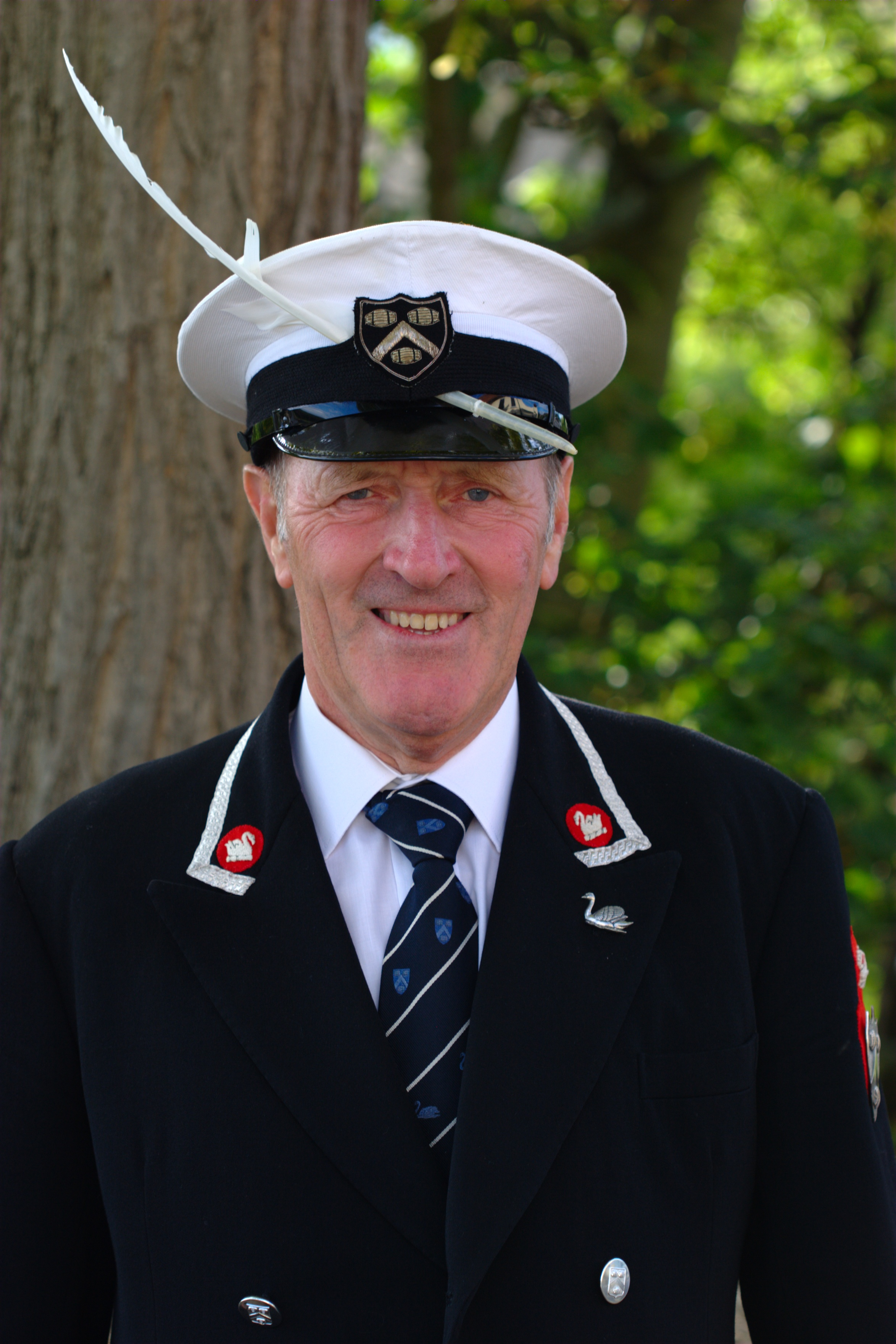
Swan marker of the Worshipful Company of Vintners, in his blue uniform, during 2011 swan upping, Abingdon.

Swan Upping at Cookham, by Stanley Spencer, oil on canvas, 1915–19

== See also ==
- Royal fish
- Royal Swans
