= Warden of the Swans =

Office in the Royal Household of the Sovereign of the United Kingdom

The Warden of the Swans is an office in the Royal Household of the Sovereign of the United Kingdom, created in 1993 when the ancient post of Keeper of the King's Swans (which dated from the 13th century) was divided into two new posts. The second is the Marker of the Swans.

The first office-holder, and so far the only Warden of the Swans, is Professor Christopher Perrins, LVO, appointed in 1993.

== See also ==
- Swan Upping
