= Waterman (occupation) =

River worker who transfers passengers

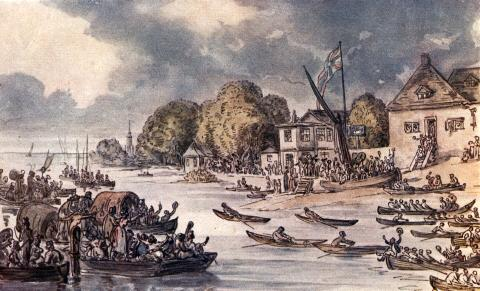
The Doggett's Coat and Badge, the oldest rowing race in the world, sees apprentice watermen competing on the River Thames. Above painting by Thomas Rowlandson (1756–1827).

A waterman is a river worker who transfers passengers across and along city centre rivers and estuaries in the United Kingdom and its colonies. Most notable are those on the River Thames and River Medway in England, but other rivers such as the River Tyne and River Dee, Wales, also had their watermen who formed guilds in medieval times. Waterman can also be a person who navigates a boat carrying passengers. These boats were often rowing boats or boats with sails. Over the years watermen acquired additional skills such as local pilotage, mooring vessels at berths, jetties, buoys, and docks, and acting as helmsman aboard large vessels.

== Watermen in the United Kingdom: 1197 to 1859 ==
Watermen or wherrymen were an essential part of early London. Using a small boat called a wherry or skiff they would ferry passengers along and across the river. With bad rural roads and narrow congested city streets, the Thames was the most convenient highway in the region. Until the mid-18th century London Bridge was the only Thames bridge below Kingston upon Thames.

In 1197, King Richard I sold the Crown's rights over the Thames to the Corporation of the City of London, which tried to issue licensing to boats on the river. It remained under royal prerogative until 1350 when King Edward III passed an Act of Parliament prohibiting the obstruction of the river. Structures that had been built out into the river for fishing and milling purposes made the river difficult to navigate and lent to it an unregulated chaotic mix of boats.

In 1510, Henry VIII granted a licence (a form of licensed public transport) to watermen, giving exclusive rights to carry passengers on the river. In 1545 almshouses for watermen, called "The Hospital of St. Stephen" were built by Henry VIII in the Woolstaple, New Palace Yard, Westminster.

An Act of Parliament in 1555 formalized the trade by setting up a company to govern tariffs and reduce accidents. The new company had jurisdiction over all watermen plying between Windsor (in Berkshire) and Gravesend (in Kent). The Act empowered the London mayor and aldermen to yearly choose eight of the "best sort" of watermen to be company rulers, and to make and enforce regulations. It also specified a seven-year apprenticeship in order to gain an encyclopaedic knowledge of the complex water currents and tides on the Thames. Watermen freeman were now required to pay quarterage, or paid quarterly contributions. This was a constant source of grievance and dispute with company rulers who were frequently accused of taking bribes to "free" apprentice watermen.

A twenty-year campaign by the rank-and-file of the watermen, to introduce a more representative government in their company, resulted, on the eve of the English Civil War in 1642, in the introduction of a form of indirect democracy. The watermen at the 55 "leading towns and stairs" were empowered to each year choose representatives, who would in turn propose candidates to become company rulers. This form of government survived, with vicissitudes, until a new Act of Parliament in 1827 restored an oligarchical form of government.

London's lack of bridges and rolling marshy landscape to the south and east were perfect for access by boat and the Thames was the main thoroughfare for all kinds of traffic. In the 15th and 16th centuries the narrow spans of the Old London Bridge restricted the flow of the slow moving and meandering river Thames allowing it to freeze during the winter months complete with frost fair so that Londoners were able to simply walk across the frozen river.

The Oxford-Burcot Commission, appointed by James I in an Act of Parliament in 1605, was an attempt to manage the river. In 1630 the commission built the first of three locks on the Thames. A large proportion of watermen's income came from the ferrying of passengers across river to the theater.

The arrival of the horse-drawn coach in 1630, sedan chairs, and most London theatres and pleasure gardens moving from Bankside on the south bank to the north bank, drastically reduced the trade available to watermen and caused financial hardship, as described by "water poet" John Taylor.

In 1635 appeals from watermen against (then horse-drawn) hackney carriages led to a royal proclamation by King Charles I that "The great number of Hackney Coaches of late ... are not only a great disturbance to his Majesty ... but the streets themselves are so pestered and the pavements so broken up that the common passage is thereby hindered and made dangerous and the price of hay and provender & thereby made exceeding dear wherefore we expressly command and forbid that no Hackney or hired coach be used or suffered in London Westminster or the suburbs thereof except they be to travel at least three miles out of the same". Two years later he cancelled this ban.

During the English Civil War watermen were free from impressment and could negotiate higher rates of pay from the navy. Samuel Pepys, who commuted by water from his home to his job at the Admiralty, refers to the death of his waterman in his diaries of 1665 revealing the particular vulnerability of Thames watermen to infection during the Great Plague of London.

In 1700 watermen combined with their colleagues in cargo to form the Company of Watermen and Lightermen. The free water clause, introduced by the West India Dock Act of 1799 and the gradual construction of a greater number of bridges, especially Westminster Bridge in 1750, forced great change on the river trade during this period of Industrial Revolution. Freight could now be moved along a river and canal system with waterway access to the Midlands and Bristol. The port provided London with its great wealth and relied heavily on the transshipping skills of watermen and lightermen to run smoothly. This was the boom time for lighterage and fortunes were made by the captains of the distinctive red sailed Thames sailing barges at this time.

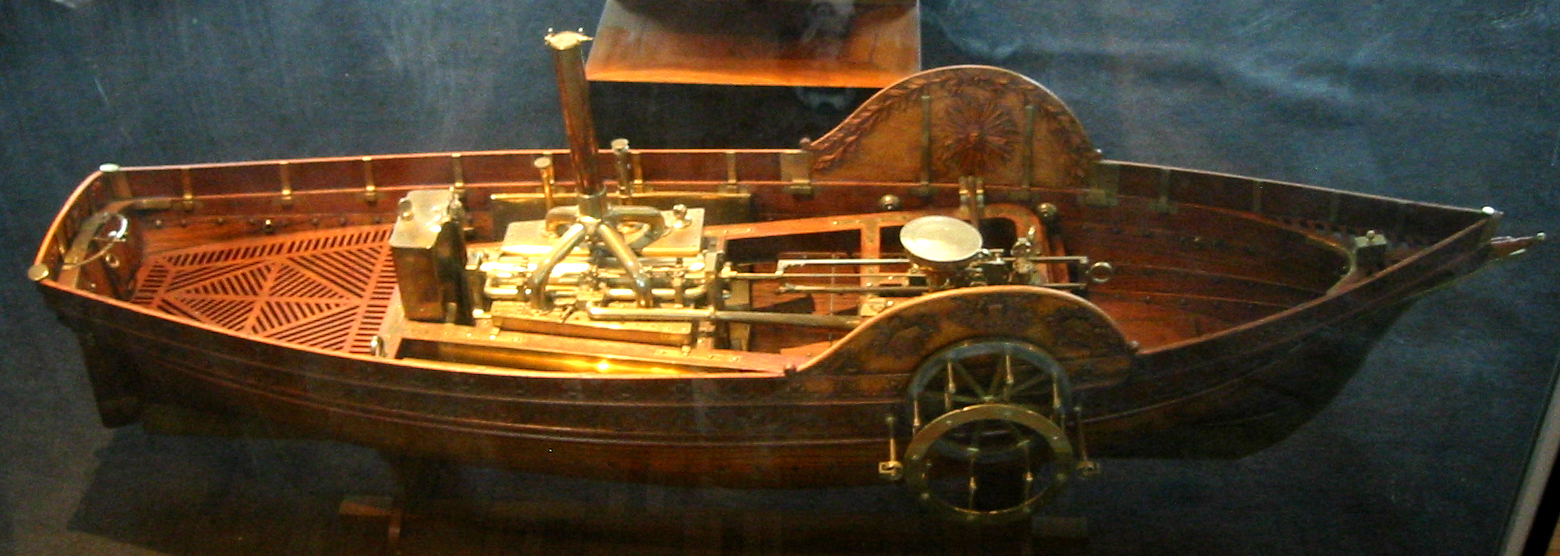
Model of a steamship, built by d'Abbans in 1784

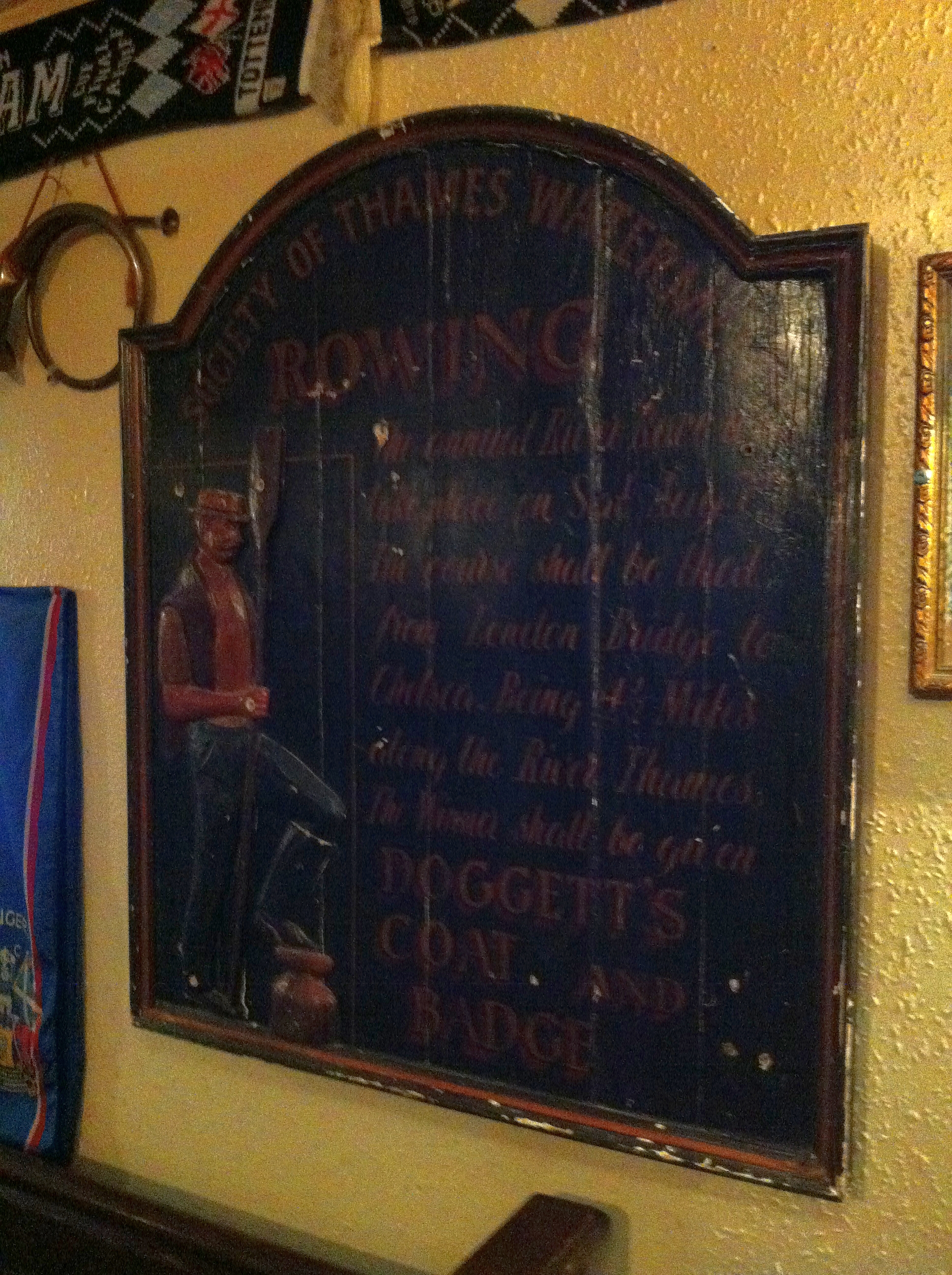
Announcement of the annual race for Doggett's Coat and Badge

Thames watermen in times of war were always the first to be enlisted, and until 1814 pressed, to crew on royal naval or merchant marine vessels and acted as a reserve of skilled mariners. After the American War of 1812 many decided to settle in the United States at the cessation of hostilities.

The arrival of steamboats in 1819 and steam launches rendered the small Wherry, with its limited capacity, obsolete for mass public transport use, often heavy wash from steamers rocked or sank small wherries and frightened potential passengers away. The Woolwich Steam Packet Company was established in 1834 and soon amalgamated with the Watermen's Steam Packet Company creating the London Steamboat Company which emerged as the leading carrier.

Thames watermen played an important part in the very early movements that ultimately led to the creation of modern trade unionism in the United Kingdom, most notably in the writings of pamphleteer John Taylor (1580–1653) and later with the use of petitions or "petitions of grievances" in particular the petitions supporting the curtailment of the growth of hackney coaches in the 17th century. As far back as 1644, the House of Commons had specifically exempted them from land service—the use of watermen in land armies—as a direct result of the group pressure exerted by watermen and it is clear that these spectacular early victories redefined the way they negotiated with those in power.

The absence of an effective police force meant that watermen often died prematurely in a city prone to riots and mob violence. Apart from the obvious occupational risks of the trade, death by drowning, watermen were particularly susceptible to bronchial diseases caught from working and living close to waters of the Thames. The invention of the flush toilet in the 1840s quickly turned the Thames into a giant sewer causing typhoid and cholera outbreaks and the Great Stink of 1858. It forced a redesign of the city's sewage system in The Embankment area, a popular area for watermen to ply their trade. Totally redesigned or embanked, it routed sewage away from the river but also removed the stairs and sloping incline to the river, replacing the access points with piers. It prevented flooding; but it cut many waterfront houses and buildings off from boat access via their watergates.

== Watermen in the United Kingdom: 1859 to 1999 ==
An 1859 Act of Parliament abolished many privileges held by the Watermen's Company; further, it set up the Thames Conservancy creating two bodies with responsibilities for the Thames.

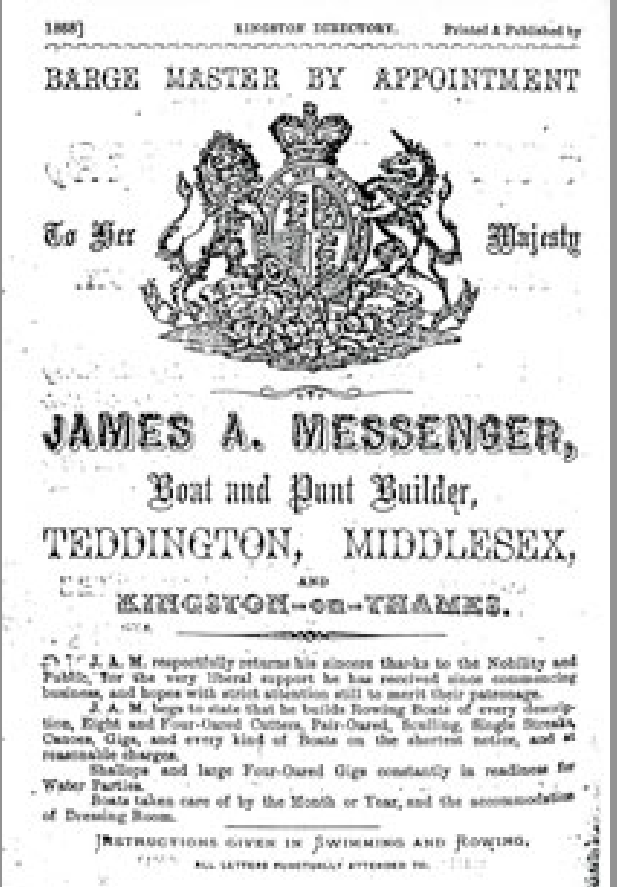
James A. Messenger -ca1858 poster describing how he was barge master to Her Majesty Queen Victoria—it reads—Barge Master by appointment To Her Majesty —— James A. Messenger Boat and Punt Builder Teddington, Middlesex And Kingston-on-Thames (The rest of the text is difficult to decipher accurately) The barge master to the Queen was considered the most eminent of the Queen's Watermen. Messenger also won the Doggett's Coat and Badge

In 1871 the Labour Protection League gave lightermen in particular the ability to negotiate better terms from their employers. Early thinkers interested in social reform, such as Charles Dickens, chose to study river workers, before vividly describing their grim lives in the novel Our Mutual Friend in 1865 and watermen in a short essay entitled Silent Highwaymen in 1879, both works that sparked a new social conscience.

In 1878 the sinking of the Princess Alice with loss of 600 lives profoundly shocked and changed public opinion within Victorian era society.

In the latter part of the 1870s-1890s the growth of railways increased the use of the river for pleasure boating. Villages outside London such as Maidenhead and Pangbourne flourished as people came to hire skiffs and punts for a day on the river.

In 1889 following the lead taken by stevedores, watermen and lightermen joined the successful The Great London Dock Strike and the Amalgamated Society of Watermen, Lightermen and Bargemen was hastily formed in 1893 eventually merging with the Transport and General Workers' Union in 1922. Many watermen patriotically turned their barges over to government use during World War I. The transport of coal and goods was of particular importance during wartime, however, during the 1920s worsening conditions and industrial action again brought London's docks to a halt.

The British Tugowners Association was founded in 1934. It allowed watermen to use their qualifications and skills, particularly in close quarter maneuvers, in ports overseas; skills that in recent years with the use of newer technology especially the introduction of bow thrusters have seen a decline in use.

In the late 1930s speed trials took place on the Thames for Armed high speed launches some of which would later form the fleet of boats used in Air Sea Rescue piloted by watermen during the 1940s. 400 barges or Thames lighters were turned over to military use as bumboats or simply beached during the Normandy landings of 1944.

Bombing during the Blitz of World War II severely damaged the docks, and by the 1960s, newer container technology and relocation to Tilbury had made the lightermen's trade, lighterage, obsolete. In terminal decline most up-river docks had been abandoned by the 1980s.
Some watermen encouraged by Festival of Britain 1951 set up river cruise companies in the late 1940s others in the 1980s but by careful consolidation of ownership and concentrating on passenger comfort, some offering night cruises, have successfully dominated the sector on into the new millennium. In the lighterage sector Cory Environmental, originally an amalgamation of eight companies, bucked the trend of this traditionally fragmented industry by capitalizing on an opportunity and used its empty coal barges, on return trips, to transport rubbish from London's streets generating enough extra revenue to buy up surplus barges from smaller lighterage companies as they sold up. Between 1967 and 1976 over 40 lighterage firms closed down.

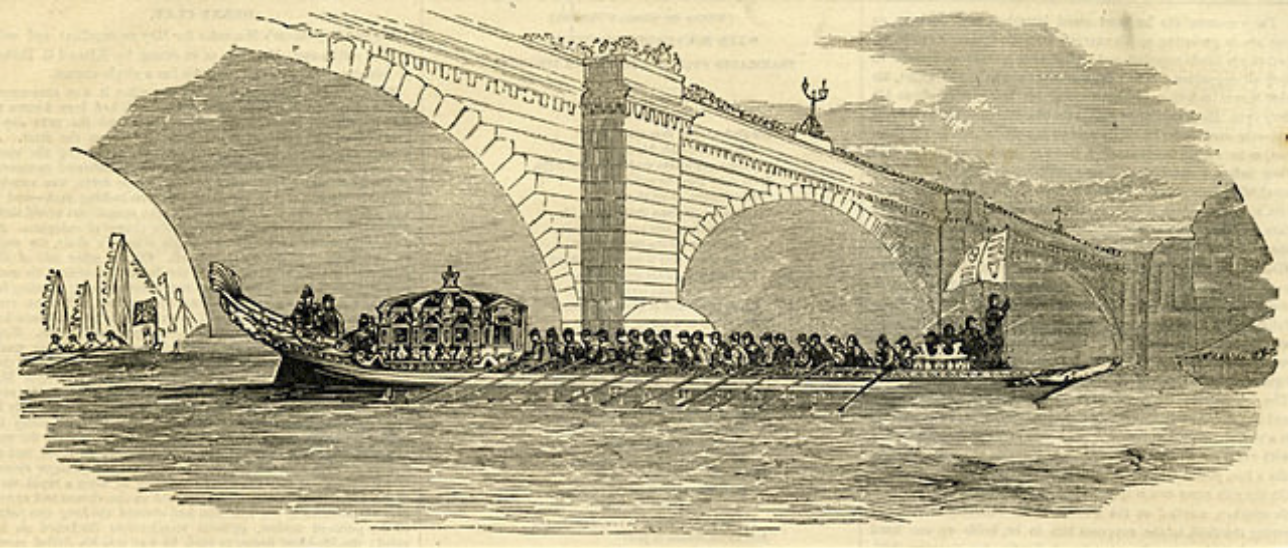
Queen Victoria's Royal Barge. This would have been the barge of which James A. Messenger was the Master in his service from 1862 to 1901. The photo is of an etching created in 1854.

Regular and fairly well paid work for Thames watermen in times of economic downturn was on the so-called Bovril Boats, which continued as they had done since 1887, to take London's sewage from Crossness and Beckton to the Thames Estuary at Black Deep, where the sludge was discharged. This practice continued until the 1990s when new EU legislation prevented the dumping of sewage at sea and forced this process to stop. It also corresponded with a fundamental change in public opinion on environmental issues and the use of marine resources. In 1999 Thames Clippers began operating a water-bus commuter service between eastern and central London. In 2003 a subsidy was made available by local government looking for the greener solution that reusing waterways provide. Passengers traveling by boat or river buses and the removal of London's rubbish by Lighter mean less traffic on London's streets and almost zero vibration from the movement of cargo.

=== The Company of Watermen and Lightermen ===
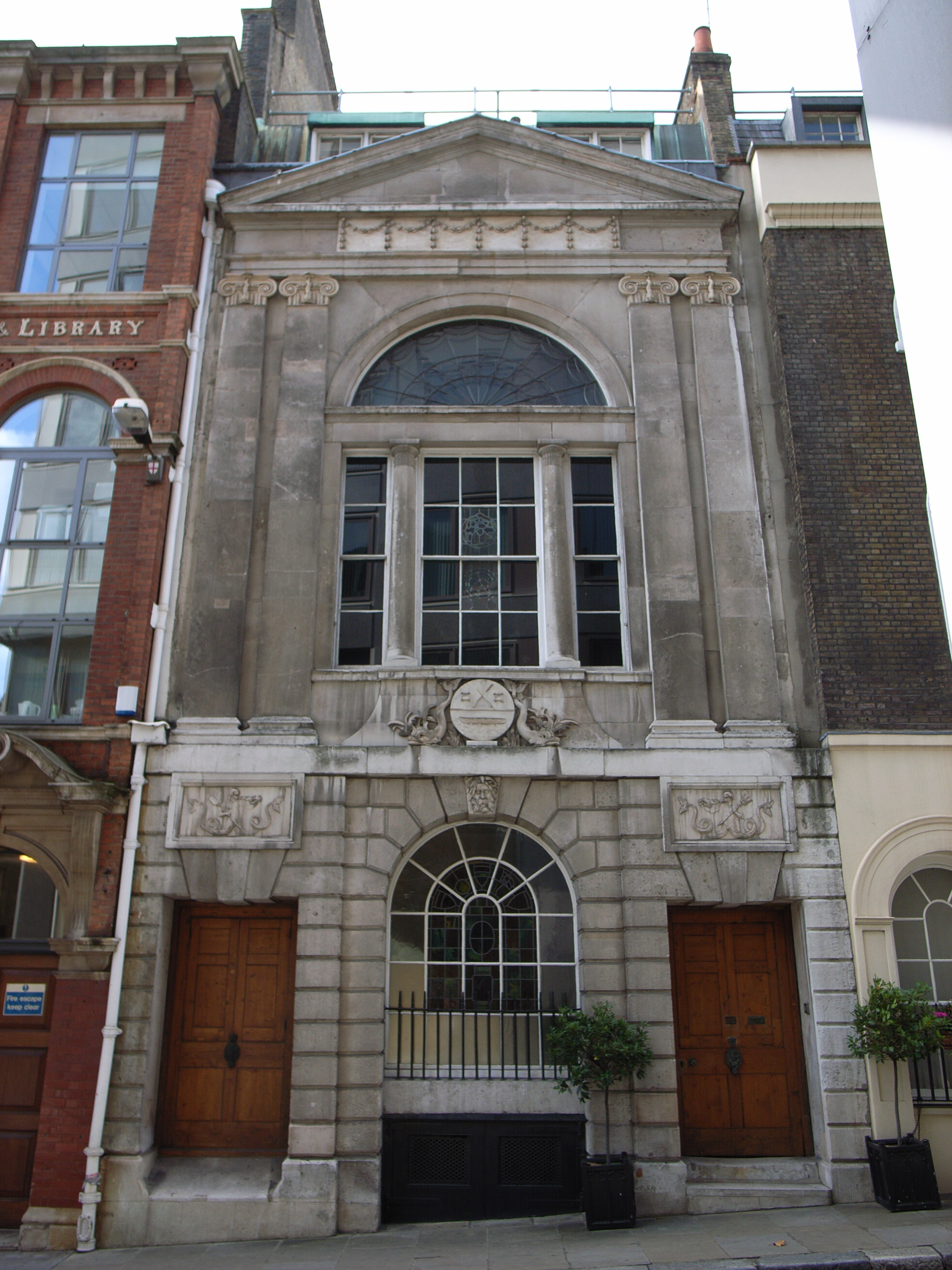
Watermen's Hall (1778–80), by William Blackburn.

The Company of Watermen and Lightermen is a City Guild without Grant of Livery and licenses Thames Watermen. Its ancient apprenticeship index is a unique resource to genealogical research however despite its mediæval guild roots it is an active lobbying force today. Working alongside The Passenger Boat Association, it consults and negotiates with national and local government and its agencies on behalf of its members. In 2003 funds were made available via CWL using government grants, to assist apprentices from the riverside east London boroughs of Tower Hamlets and Newham.

The Doggett's Coat and Badge, which was first raced in 1715, is the oldest continuously run river race and is now claimed to be the oldest continually staged annual sporting event in the world.

In 1975 a charity called Transport On Water (TOW) was founded by watermen and lightermen and people in public life. It aims to maintain the Thames and other waterways, including the river Medway, as working rivers. TOW has organised The Thames Barge Driving Race which has taken place annually in June, since 1974.

=== Transport strategy for London ===
More than 2,000 commuters a day now travel by river which added up to three million people in 2002. Ken Livingstone's Transport Strategy for London 2005 states that: The safe use of the Thames for passenger and freight services should be developed. Passenger services will be encouraged, particularly services that relate to its cultural and architectural excellence and tourism. Use of London's other navigable waterways for freight, consistent with their roles for leisure use and as ecosystems, will be encouraged. Transport for London now has a river transport arm, London River Services, to regulate and promote travel on the Thames as a public transport service.

=== National Boatmasters' Licence ===
New legislation that came into force in 2007 set up a new national licence system, covering all inland waterways. Rather than a five-year apprenticeship, it enables anyone to become a captain after a less onerous qualification period of just two years plus six months of "local knowledge" training on the central stretch of the Thames. The licence brings UK regulations into line with EU licensing standards. Critics claimed it would make the Thames, a tidal river below Teddington lock, more hazardous to travel on. Under the old licence system approximately 23 per cent failed their first year apprenticeship exam. It is estimated that 600 Watermen and Lightermen currently work the Thames.

Date	Total Watermen working the Thames
1628	2,453
1850	1,500 Mayhew
2006	600

== Watermen in Australia ==
As well as in Britain itself, the term "watermen" was used to describe boatmen performing essentially similar duties on coastal waterways in the British colonies. This was especially the case on Sydney Harbour and in Van Diemens Land, on the River Derwent around Hobart and the River Tamar around Launceston.

Regular ferry services across the Derwent existed by 1810, and the first known licensed ferryman were Urias Allender and John Nowland in 1816. By the 1830s these ferrymen were known as "watermen" in official records and the term continued to be used until the last licensed watermen retired in the 1940s. The heyday of Hobart Town's watermen was from the 1840s to the mid-1850s, when over 200 licences were issued to different individuals, but with improved steam ferry services the numbers declined and in 1896 only 21 were licensed. By this stage they mostly operated water taxi and excursion services around the port. They were held to be distinct in official records from other categories of maritime workers such as the "boatmen", "craftsmen" or "bargemen" who operated sailing vessels in the river trade, and those men operating on the steam ferries and river steamers that also operated out of the port.

Tasmanian watermen's boats varied widely in size and style, from small dinghies for hire up to large sailing-rowing excursion boats around 28 feet in length. The largest of these, the 8-oared, 28-foot Admiral built in 1865 by Thomas Morland, was restored by the Admiral Restoration Group in 2006-09 and has been rowed at the Australian Wooden Boat 2011-2017 as the last known surviving 19th century Tasmanian waterman's boat. During the 20th century motor launches up to 15 meters in length were licensed as waterman's boats, although the term has now slipped from common usage in favour of "excursion boats" or, incorrectly, "ferries." In 2018 about ten vessels offer excursions out of the Port of Hobart, but none in the "hire boat" tradition of the watermen.

The main base for watermen in Hobart from the 1830s to the 1940s was at Waterman's Dock at the end of Murray Street in front of Parliament House. Watermen's licences were also issued for boatmen operating elsewhere in south-eastern Tasmania including Port Arthur and the D'Entrecasteaux Channel.

== Watermen in the United States ==
Some evidence suggests that a number of English sailors who had participated in the American War of 1812 settled in the Chesapeake Bay area, in the United States and became watermen in the small waterside communities on Tangier Island and Smith Island in Virginia and Tilghman Island, Maryland that have retained a unique character and dialect to this day.

The first Africans arrived in the Chesapeake Bay area on a Dutch ship at Old Point Comfort in 1619; they and their descendants have had roles in the history and economy of the Chesapeake Bay ever since. The enslaved Africans had engaged in oystering, crabbing, fishing, sailing, boat building and net making in their homeland, and many of them took up the same occupations in the Chesapeake Bay. In the following centuries, their descendants helped build the communities and the culture that formed around the Bay, and their labor contributed greatly to the development of the region's economically dominant marine industries and naval presence. The Bay's waterways provided transportation for the slave trade that fed the plantation system, but also provided the means for them to escape to freedom.

African American watermen became expert fishermen in the Chesapeake Bay area and border state of Maryland's Eastern Shore, but with the arrival of steamboats in the 19th century many of them found work as river workers. Traditional white watermen shied away from the considerable risks such as boiler explosions or fires that often occurred on early steamboats.

African American watermen went on to gain financial success and freedom by specialising in the crewing of these boats within the Mississippi River Steamboat economy of the 1840s.

An article published by the American Meteorological Society in Weather, Climate, and Society says, "The village of Bellevue was founded in the early twentieth century by African Americans working in the seafood industry as shuckers of oysters, pickers of crabs, or as watermen "working the water." A seafood-processing factory that employed and housed African Americans sold part of the adjoining land to African Americans. By the 1930s, the Bellevue Seafood Company was African American owned and operated, and up until the 1970s there were many African American watermen who worked the same areas as white watermen, often on the same boats, and sold their catch to the same processors, with apparently little racial discrimination present."

== Famous watermen ==
- James A. Messenger (1826-1901), Bargemaster to Her Majesty Queen Victoria (1862-1901)
- John Taylor (1580–1653), the water poet

== See also ==
- Queen's Bargemaster
- Gondola
- Thames sailing barge
- London Bridge
- Thames Barrier
- 1928 Thames flood
- Bumboat
- Henry Mayhew
- William Lionel Wyllie
- George Robert Sims
- Edward William Cooke
- Swan Upping
- SS Richard Montgomery
- Watermen's stairs
- Foster Yeoman
- Cory Environmental
