= Bovril boats =

Vessels for dumping London area sludge at sea

Bovril boats, also known formally as sludge vessels, were specially designed sewage dumping vessels that operated on the River Thames from 1887 to 1998. Their task was to remove London's human solid waste from Beckton and Crossness for disposal on the ebb tide at sea, at Black Deep, an extremely deep part of the North Sea fifteen miles off Foulness, on one of the main approaches to the Thames Estuary. Similar boats operated on the Manchester Ship Canal, the Tyne, and elsewhere.

== History ==
The introduction of the flush toilet in the 1840s caused London's ageing sewers to overflow. In 1858 following the summer of The Great Stink and outbreaks of cholera among the public, Sir Joseph Bazalgette was appointed to redesign London's sewage system. He was only partially successful however, as the sludge part of the human waste sewage began to build up on mud banks further down stream along the Thames.

The seriousness of the problem was highlighted in 1878 when a passenger steamer, The Princess Alice, sank at Gallions Reach following a collision with a cargo vessel, with great loss of life including many children. After the dead were later recovered by watermen, it was found that many had in fact not drowned, but instead had died from ingesting the poisoned waters of the toxic sludge-filled river.

== Royal Commission ==
A Royal Commission of 1882 concluded that it was necessary to create a cleaner river by separating the sludge part from the liquid sewage and remove it via boat for disposal at sea. In 1887 the first ship of a long line of 'pump and dump' effluent tanker vessels was launched. These ships, later nicknamed by those who crewed them as Bovril boats to describe their brown liquid cargo, were very well maintained, as hygienic as possible, and specially designed for marine disposal. Complex hydrostatic calculations had to be made when carrying liquid cargo but crews received reasonably good pay and regular work. The last of the fleet were: Bexley, Hounslow, and Newham, all named after London Boroughs.

== European Union legislation ==
In the 1990s, European Union legislation forbidding the dumping of raw sewage at sea, and increasing environmental concerns that sewage was contaminating beaches, led to the phasing out of the fleet and many were scrapped or sold on to private companies. Newer technology finally allowed the sludge to be incinerated in a self-powering incinerator and sold on as fertilizer pellets for use on food crops.

== See also ==
- Crossness Pumping Station
