= Woolwich Cemetery =

Cemetery in London

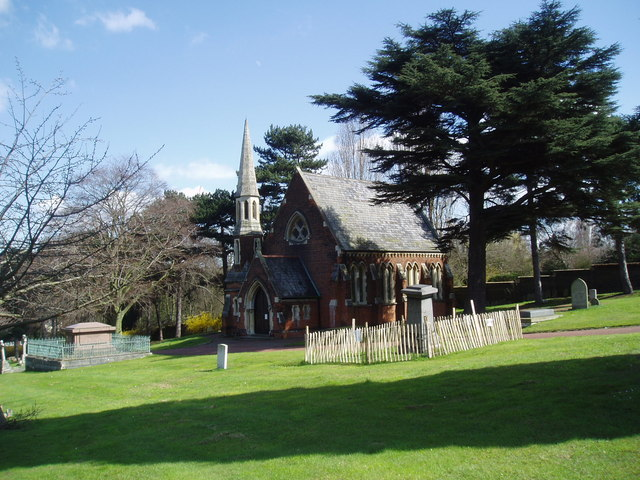
- Mortuary chapel, Woolwich New Cemetery
- Interactive map of Woolwich Cemetery

Details
- Established: 1856
- Location: Kings Highway, Plumstead, Royal Borough of Greenwich
- Country: England
- Coordinates: 51.476°N 0.099°E
- Type: Public
- Owned by: Royal Borough of Greenwich
- Size: 12 acres (4.9 ha)

Woolwich Cemetery is a cemetery in southeast London, situated south-east of Woolwich, in Kings Highway, Plumstead, on land that was formerly part of Plumstead Common. The first cemetery, which is sometimes referred to as the Woolwich Old Cemetery, was opened in 1856 by the Woolwich Burial Board and the 12-acre site was almost full within 30 years; in 1885, a new cemetery was established on adjacent land to the east. The latter site is still in use, and contains graves of those who died in explosions at the Royal Arsenal, plus a World War I memorial with the names of 14 casualties; in total the cemetery has 96 World War I and 81 World War II Commonwealth war graves.

The cemetery has been used as a film location for The Krays (1990) and Harry Brown (2009).

== Memorials ==
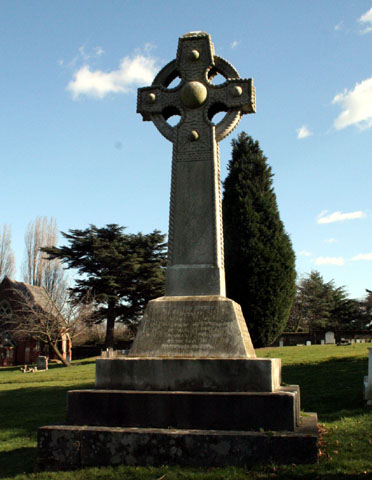
Memorial to those killed in the Princess Alice steamer disaster

Woolwich Old Cemetery was the burial place for 120 people lost in the Princess Alice disaster on the River Thames on 3 September 1878 when the pleasure steamer was struck by the collier steamer Bywell Castle. A commemorative cross was erected by a national sixpenny subscription to which over 23,000 people contributed.

Other notable burials include:

- Hubert Bland (1855–1914) – journalist, socialist and co-founder of the Fabians
- Thomas Monaghan VC (1833–1895)
- John Taylor VC (1822–1857)
