= John Taylor (VC) =

Recipient of the Victoria Cross

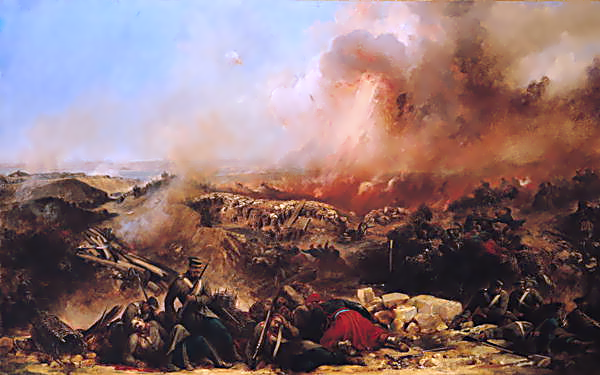
- Depiction of the Siege of Sebastopol
- Born: c. 1822; Bristol, Gloucestershire
- Died: 25 February 1857 (aged 34–35); Woolwich, London
- Burial place: Woolwich cemetery
- Military career
- Allegiance: United Kingdom
- Branch: Royal Navy
- Rank: Captain of the Forecastle
- Conflicts: First Anglo-Chinese War; Crimean War; Second Anglo-Burmese War
- Awards: Victoria Cross; Conspicuous Gallantry Medal; Legion of Honour (France)

John Taylor, VC, CGM (c. 1822 – 25 February 1857) was a sailor in the Royal Navy and an English recipient of the Victoria Cross, the highest award for gallantry in the face of the enemy that can be awarded to British and Commonwealth forces.

== Royal Navy ==
Taylor was about 33 years old, and a captain of the forecastle in the Royal Navy, serving in the Naval Brigade, during the Crimean War when the following deed took place for which he was awarded the Victoria Cross (VC).

On 18 June 1855 on the Crimean Peninsula, immediately after the assault on Sebastopol, a soldier of the 57th Regiment, who had been wounded in both legs, was observed sitting up and calling for help. At once the second-in-command, Henry James Raby, of the scaling party, another seaman, Henry Curtis, and Captain of the Forecastle Taylor left the shelter of their battery works and ran forward a distance of 70 yards, across open ground, through heavy gunfire and succeeded in carrying the wounded man to safety.

== Later life and legacy ==
John Taylor's Cross is held in the Sheesh Mahal Collection in Patiala, India. The group formed part of the Maharaja Bhupendra Singh's collection, which was bequeathed to the Museum on the death of the Maharajah's son in 1947, and consists of the VC, Conspicuous Gallantry Medal, China War Medal 1842, India General Service Medal 1854 clasp Pegu, Crimea Medal with clasps Inkermann and Sebastopol, Legion of Honour and Turkish Crimea Medal.

Taylor was buried in Woolwich cemetery in southeast London.

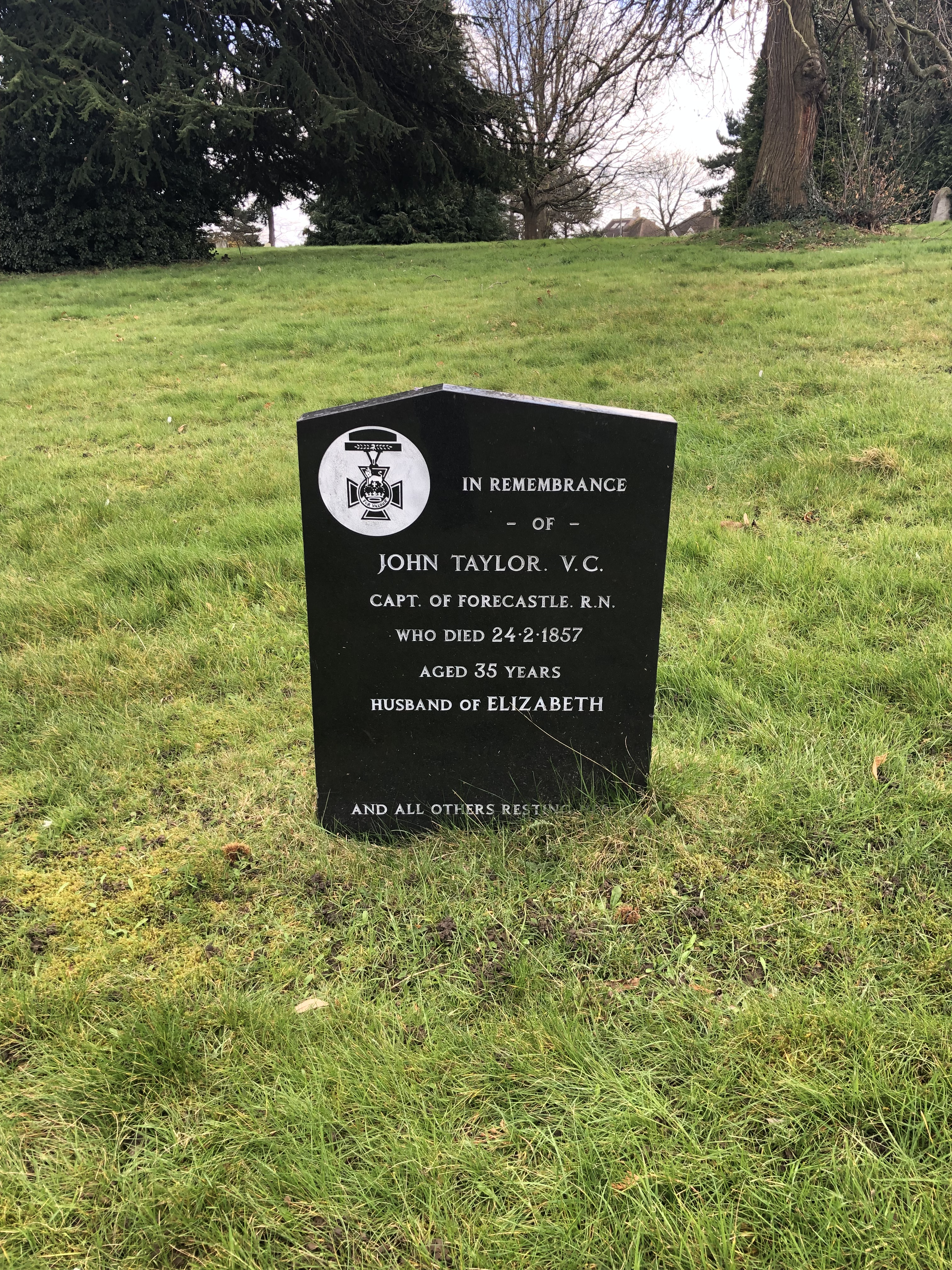
