= Henry Raby =

Royal Navy admiral and recipient of the Victoria Cross

Rear-Admiral Henry Raby VC CB
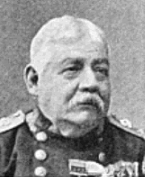
- Born: 26 September 1827; Boulogne, France
- Died: 13 February 1907 (aged 79); Southsea, Portsmouth, England
- Burial place: Highland Road Cemetery, Portsmouth
- Military career
- Allegiance: United Kingdom
- Branch: Royal Navy
- Service years: 1842–1878
- Rank: Rear-Admiral
- Conflicts: Crimean War
- Awards: Victoria Cross; Order of the Bath; Légion d'honneur (France); Medal of Military Valour (Sardinia)

Rear-Admiral Henry James Raby VC CB (26 September 1827 – 13 February 1907) was a recipient of the Victoria Cross, the highest and most prestigious award for gallantry in the face of the enemy that can be awarded to British and Commonwealth forces.

== Early life and career ==
Henry James Raby was born at Boulogne, France on 26 September 1827, the son of Mr A.T. Raby of Llanelli, Carmarthenshire, Wales. He attended Sherborne School from 1841 to 1842, during which time he was a member of Abbey House.

After leaving Sherborne School, he entered the Royal Navy in 1842 as a 1st Class Volunteer in H.M.S. Monarch. He served for 11 months with the Naval Brigade in the Crimea being promoted Commander for his services.

== VC action ==
Raby was 27 years old, and a Lieutenant in the Royal Navy serving with the Naval Brigade during the Crimean War when the following deed took place for which he was awarded the VC.

On 18 June 1855 in the Crimea, immediately after the assault on Sebastopol, a soldier of the 57th Regiment, who had been wounded in both legs, was observed sitting up and calling for help. At once Lieutenant Raby and seamen Henry Curtis and John Taylor left the shelter of their battery works and ran forward a distance of 70 yards, across open ground, through heavy gunfire and succeeded in carrying the wounded man to safety.

Raby was the first man to receive the Victoria Cross from Queen Victoria at the first investiture on 26 June 1857. The Queen pinned the crosses on the recipients in strict order of service precedence and seniority. Commander Raby therefore came first as the senior officer in the senior service on parade, although his VC deed had been performed after that of the midshipman, Lucas, who certainly stands as the first to be granted the award of the cross. Similarly in the army contingent, Sergeant-Major Grieve was the first soldier on the parade to receive the cross, because he belonged to the Cavalry, an arm senior to the Infantry, although his VC deed was later than those of the four infantry soldiers who earned it at the Alma.

== Subsequent career and death ==
In command of H.M.S. Medusa and later of H.M.S. Alecto in the 1860s, he played a prominent part in the suppression of the slave trade on the West Coast of Africa and was present at the attack and destruction of Porto Novo in Dahomey. He was promoted Captain for his services in 1862. He was awarded C.B. in 1875 and commanded H.M.S. Aventure on the China Station 1868–1871. He retired as a Rear Admiral 1878, and devoted the remaining years of his life to service charities.

Raby died at his home in Southsea on 13 February 1907.

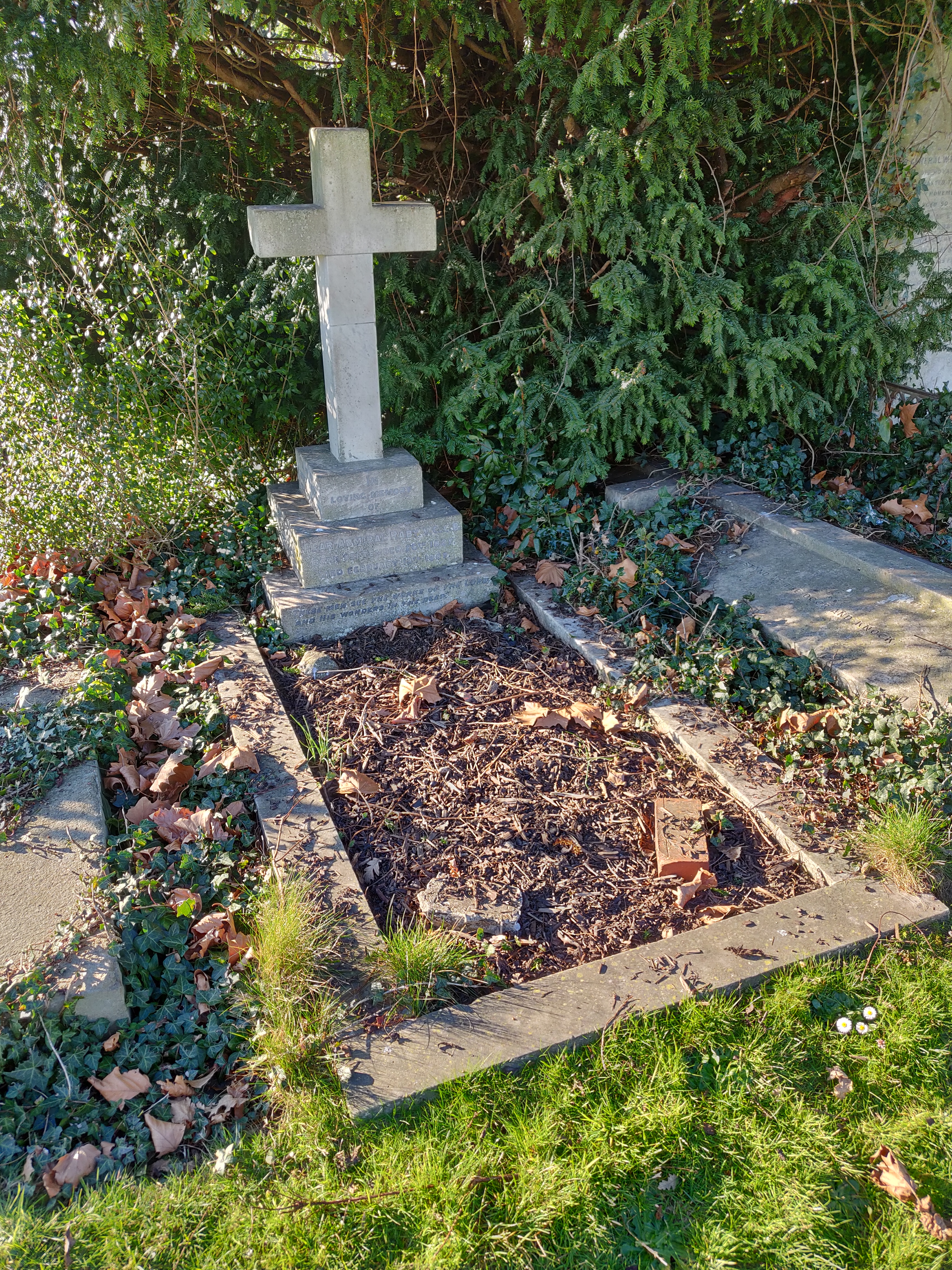
Grave of Rear Admiral Raby V.C.

Raby's obituary appeared in The Shirburnian in March 1907 [Reprint from The Times, 14 February 1907]:

Rear-Admiral H. J. Raby, V.C., C.B. Born September 21st, 1827; died February 13th, 1907. Rear-Admiral Henry James Raby, V.C., C.B. (retired), died yesterday morning at his residence, 8 Clarence Parade, Southsea. Admiral Raby had resided in Southsea since his retirement from the Navy. He took a great interest in the Royal Seamen and Marines' Orphanage, the Royal Sailors' Home, and in various other philanthropic Institutions in the town. Rear-Admiral Raby was a son of Mr. Arthur Turnour Raby of Llanelly, Carmarthen, and was educated at Sherborne. He was born in September, 1827, and entered the Navy as a first-class Volunteer on board 'The Monarch' in 1842. In 1848 he was rated mate, and two years later received his commission as lieutenant, in this grade he served for some time in the ‘Wasp' on the West Coast of Africa, and on the outbreak of war with Russia in 1854 was sent to the Black Sea. There he was landed with the Naval Brigade and served in the trenches from October 23rd, 1854, until September 16th, 1855. As second-in-command of a ladder party at the attack of the Redan, he performed the act of gallantry for which he received the Victoria Cross and which was thus described in the Gazette:-'On June 18th, 1855, immediately after the assault on Sevastopol, a soldier of the 57th regiment, who had been shot through both legs, was observed sitting up and calling for assistance. Climbing over the breastwork of the advanced sap, Lieutenant Raby and two seamen proceeded upwards of 70 yards across the open space towards the salient angle of the Redan, and in spite of the heavy fire which was still continuing, succeeded in carrying the wounded soldier to a place of safety at the imminent risk of their own lives. Lieutenant Raby was the sole survivor to reap the reward and wear the Cross.' For his services in the trenches he was in September, 1855, promoted to commander and received the Crimean, Sardinian, and Turkish Medals, with Clasps for Sevastopol and Inkerman, the 5th class of the Medjidie, and the ribbon of the Legion of Honour. His next appointment was to the command of the 'Allecto' on the West Coast of Africa from 1859 to 1862, during which period he commanded the boats of the squadron at the capture of Porto Novo in April 1861, when he was wounded, and for this and other services in the oppression of the slave trade was repeatedly mentioned in despatches. He received his promotion to the rank of Captain in November, 1862, for his services on the West Coast, and subsequently commanded the 'Adventure' in China from 1868 to 1871. In 1877 he retired from the active list, and his subsequent step was gained in retirement. He had in 1875 been made a Companion of the Bath, and in 1895 was granted a good service pension, which is by the Admiral's death placed at the disposal of the Admiralty. Admiral Raby married in 1863, Judith, daughter of the late Colonel Watkin Forster of Holt Manor, Trowbridge. H.J.R. entered Mr. James' House in 1841, he left the same year.

== The medal ==
His medal is on display at the Royal Naval Museum in Portsmouth.
