= Henry Curtis (VC) =

Henry Curtis VC
- Born: 21 December 1822; Romsey, Hampshire
- Died: 23 November 1896 (aged 73); Portsea, Hampshire
- Burial place: Kingston Cemetery, Portsea
- Military career
- Allegiance: United Kingdom
- Branch: Royal Navy
- Service years: 1841–1864
- Rank: Boatswain's Mate
- Units: Naval Brigade
- Conflicts: Crimean War
- Awards: Victoria Cross

Henry Curtis VC (21 December 1822 – 23 November 1896) was an English recipient of the Victoria Cross (VC), the highest and most prestigious award for gallantry in the face of the enemy that can be awarded to British and Commonwealth forces.

== Details ==
Curtis was 32 years old and a Boatswain's Mate in the Royal Navy (Naval Brigade) during the Crimean War when the following deed took place for which he was awarded the VC.

On 18 June 1855, in the Crimea, immediately after the assault on Sebastopol, a soldier of the 57th Regiment, who had been wounded in both legs, was observed sitting up and calling for help. At once the second-in-command of the scaling party (Henry James Raby), another seaman (John Taylor) and Boatswain's Mate Curtis left the shelter of their battery works and ran forward a distance of 70 yards, across open ground, through heavy gunfire and succeeded in carrying the wounded man to safety.

== Medal location ==
The VC is on display in the Lord Ashcroft Gallery at the Imperial War Museum, London.
