= Reach (geography) =

Straight stretch of water

A reach is a segment of a stream or arm of the sea, usually suggesting a straight, level, uninterrupted stretch. It is traditionally defined by the capabilities of sailing boats, as a stretch of a watercourse which, because it is straightish, can be sailed in one "reach" (that is, without tacking). Reaches are often named by those using the river, and a reach may be named for landmarks, natural features, and historical reasons (see, for instance, Gallions Reach, named after the family that once owned its banks).

A reach may be an expanse, or widening, of a stream channel. This commonly occurs after the stream is dammed. A reach is similar to an arm, though an arm may bend and thus have multiple reaches. The term "reach" can also refer to a level stretch, as between rapids or locks in a canal. The word may be used more generally to refer to any extended portion or stretch of land or water, or even metaphorically.

In fluvial hydrology, a reach is a convenient subdivision of study; it may be any length of river of fairly uniform characteristics, or the length between gauging stations, or simply the length of a watercourse between any two defined points. Reaches may be measured in terms of river miles. As of 2015, the US Board on Geographic Names records 334 place names in the US with the characterization of a named "reach".

== Gallery ==
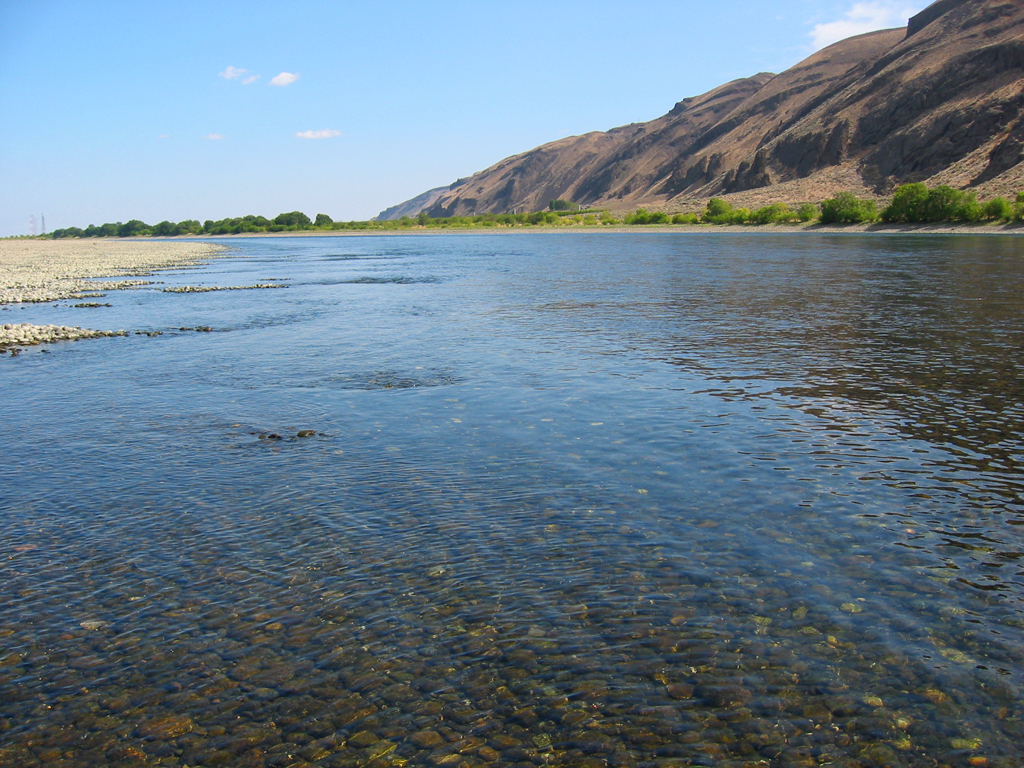
Example: Hanford Reach National Monument, Washington State, US. The last significant free-running (undammed) section of the Columbia River in the US

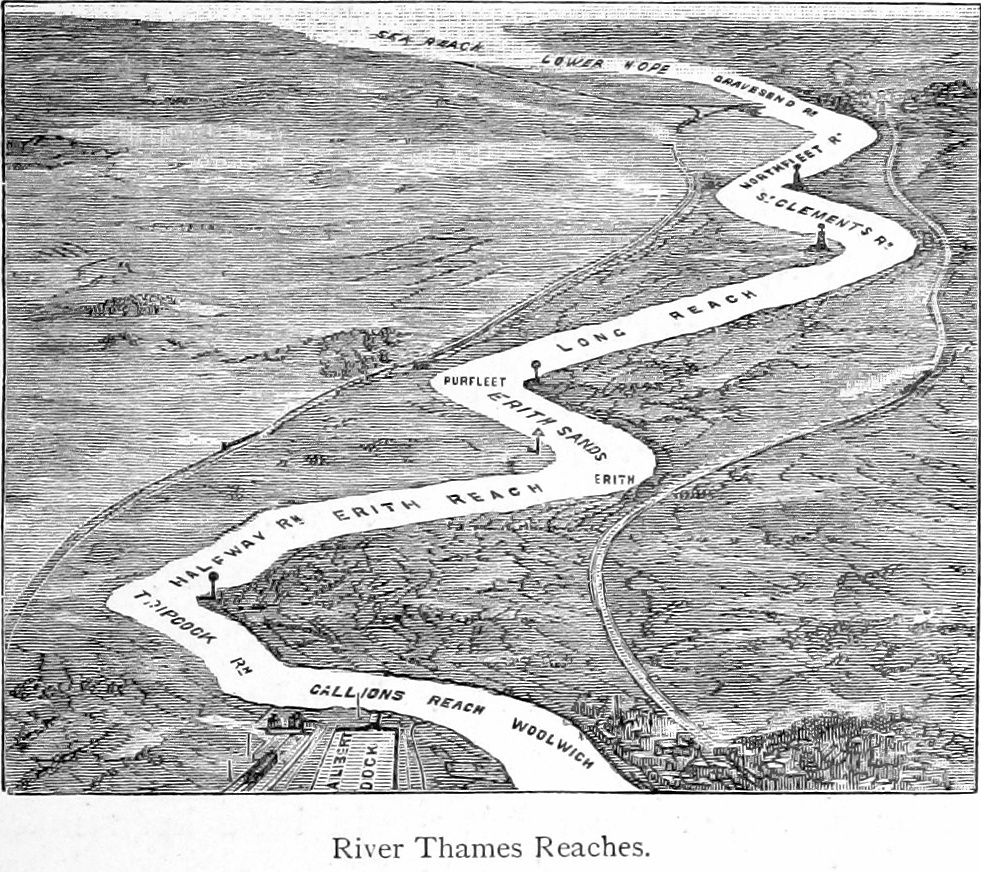
A map of the reaches of the River Thames; it can be seen that a reach is a straightish stretch (and can therefore be sailed in one reach, one straight-line path between tacks, unless the wind is too close to head-on to allow the sailing-boat to reach)

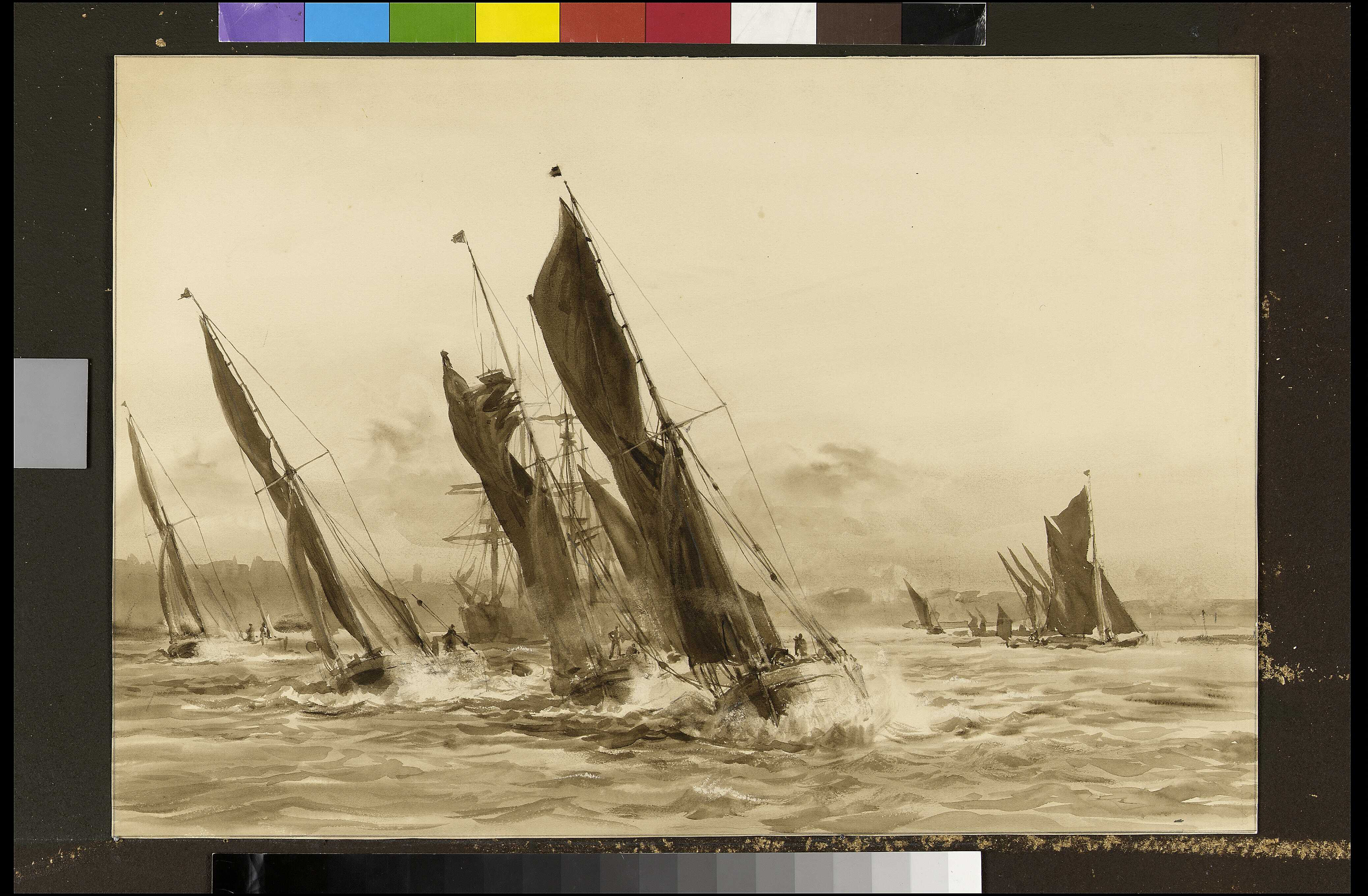
Thames barges reaching on the Thames during a race; they are probably on Gravesend Reach

== See also ==
- Meander
- Rapid
- Stream pool
