= Jerry White (historian) =

British historian

Jerry White is a British historian who has specialised in the history of London. From 1997 onwards he has worked on a trilogy of books about London from 1700 to 2000.

== Career in local government ==
Jerry White embarked upon a career in local government after leaving grammar school in Dorset in 1967. Between 1989 and 1995 he was the chief executive of the London Borough of Hackney. Between 1995 and 2009 he was one of the three Local Government Ombudsmen for England.

== Career as a historian ==
His discovery in November 1971 of the Rothschild Buildings in Flower and Dean Street, Spitalfields led him to write an oral history of it. As a consequence of this, he met Raphael Samuel who provided him with academic training as an historian.

Since 2009 he has been the visiting professor of history at Birkbeck.

== Select Bibliography ==
- Rothschild Buildings : life in an East End tenement block 1887-1920. 1980.
- Campbell Bunk: The Worst Street in North London Between the Wars (2003)
- London in the Nineteenth Century: A Human Awful Wonder of God (2008)
- London in the Twentieth Century: A City and Its People (2008)
- London: The Story of a Great City (Published in Conjunction with the Museum of London) (2010)
- London In The Eighteenth Century: A Great and Monstrous Thing (2012)
- A Great and Monstrous Thing: London in the Eighteenth Century (2013)
- "No room to live". History Today. 63 (11): 43–49. November 2013.
- Zeppelin Nights: London in the First World War (2014)
- London Stories (Everyman's Pocket Classics) (2014)
- Mansions of Misery: A Biography of the Marshalsea Debtors' Prison (The Bodley Head) (2016)
- Birth of a Global City: London in a Revolutionary World, 1789-1815 (The Bodley Head / Vintage Publishing) (2026)
