= Woolwich Steam Packet Company =

English steamboat company (1834–1888)

The Woolwich Steam Packet Company (later London Steamboat Company), operated between 1834 and 1888 and offered steamer services from central London to Woolwich and later to Kent, Essex and Suffolk. One of its ships, the Princess Alice sank after a collision near Woolwich with the loss of almost 700 lives in the greatest disaster in the history of British coastal cruising.

== History ==
The company was established in 1834 with services from central London to Woolwich and along the coasts along the Thames Estuary. These were later extended to Kent and southern Essex; subsequently a London to Ipswich packet service which inaugurated calls at Clacton in 1871.

The company amalgamated with several smaller concerns, including the Watermen's Steam Packet Company, in 1876 to form the London Steamboat Company, which was the dominant force in the Thames estuary excursion business at that time.

1878 saw the greatest disaster in the history of British coastal cruising when Princess Alice sank after a collision near Woolwich with the loss of almost 700 lives.

The Thames and Channel Steamship Co are understood to have been a closely associated company who sold their two steamers Vale of Clwyd and Glen Rosa to the London Steamboat Co in 1883.

The company struggled financially and was put up for sale at the end of 1884, becoming the River Thames Steamboat Company, which operated for three years. Their vessels were taken over by the Victoria Steamboat Association in time for the 1888 season.

== Main Excursion Vessels ==
Ship	Launched	Tonnage (GRT)	Dimensions	Notes and references
Queen of the Orwell	1862	165	171.6 feet (52.3 m) x 18.5 feet (5.6 m)	Built at Glasgow Operated a packet service from London to Ipswich for the Woolwich Steam Packet Company Inaugurated the new Clacton Pier on 18 July 1871. Renamed PS Fairy Queen. Withdrawn in 1891
Queen of the Thames	1861	143	158 feet (48 m) x 19 feet (5.8 m)	Built at Woolwich, London Operated a packet service from London to Ipswich for the Woolwich Steam Packet Company, scrapped in 1889.
Duke of Connaught	1866	127	150 feet (46 m) x 16.2 feet (4.9 m), lengthened to 159 feet (48 m) in 1875	Built by R Duncan & Co Engines: Oscillating, 2 cylinder 28in x 36in by Rankin & Blackmore; Built for the new Gareloch service from Greenock, but sold to the Campbell family in 1869. Placed on the Glasgow to Dumbarton run, with an afternoon cruise to the Gareloch. Sold after the 1875 season by Keith & Campbell to the London Steamboat Company with three other ex-Greenock & Helensburgh vessels. Scrapped in 1888 when taken over by the Victoria Steamboat Association.
Duke of Cambridge	1866	92	150.8 feet (46.0 m) x 16.1 feet (4.9 m)	Built by L Hill & Co, Port Glasgow Engines: Oscillating, 2 cylinder 28in x 36in by Rankin & Blackmore; Built for the new Gareloch service from Greenock, but sold to Keith & Campbell in 1871 after the dissolution the Greenock company. Sold after the 1875 season by Keith & Campbell to the London Steamboat Company with three other ex-Greenock & Helensburgh vessels. Survived on the Thames until approximately 1898.
Duke of Teck	1866	93	150.2 feet (45.8 m) x 16.2 feet (4.9 m)	Built by Kirkpatrick, McIntyre & Co, Port Glasgow Engines: Oscillating, 2 cylinder 28in x 36in by Rankin & Blackmore; Built for the new Gareloch service from Greenock, but sold to Keith & Campbell in 1871 after the dissolution the Greenock company. Sold after the 1875 season by Keith & Campbell to the London Steamboat Company with three other ex-Greenock & Helensburgh vessels. Survived on the Thames until approx. 1889
Duke of Edinburgh	1870	123	175 feet (53 m) x 17.1 feet (5.2 m)	Built by R Duncan & Co, Port Glasgow Engines: Oscillating, 2 cylinder 28in x 36in by Rankin & Blackmore; Built for the new Gareloch service from Greenock, but sold to Keith & Campbell in 1871 after the dissolution the Greenock company. Sold after the 1875 season by Keith & Campbell to the London Steamboat Company with three other ex-Greenock & Helensburgh vessels. Survived on the Thames until approximately 1898.
Alexandra	1865	279	230.5 feet (70.3 m) x 22.2 feet (6.8 m)	Built at Port Glasgow Scrapped after being wrecked without loss of life near London Bridge in September 1889.
Princess Alice	1865		219.4 feet (66.9 m) x 20.2 feet (6.2 m)	Built by Caird & Co Engines : 2 cylinder oscillating, 44 in x 45 in. 2 haystack boilers Built as PS Bute for the failed Wemyss Bay company which provided steamer connections to a new railhead in the 1865 season. Sold for service on the Thames in 1866 by the Watermans Company, eventually becoming part of the London Steamboat Co., renamed Princess Alice. Had a successful career on the Thames excursion trade from London until sinking with the loss of almost 700 lives on 3 September 1878.
Albert Edward	1865		219.4 feet (66.9 m) x 20.2 feet (6.2 m)	Built by Caird & Co Engines : 2 cylinder oscillating, 44 inches (1,100 mm) x 45 inches (1,100 mm). 2 haystack boilers Built for the failed Wemyss Bay company which provided steamer connections to a new railhead in the 1865 season. Sold for service on the Thames in 1866 by the Watermans Company, eventually becoming part of the London Steamboat Co. Had a successful career on the Thames until scrapped in 1888 after passing into the control of the Victoria Steamboat Association
Vale of Clwyd	1865		186.5 feet (56.8 m) x 18.1 feet (5.5 m)	Built by T B Seath & Co at Rutherglen Engines : 2 cylinder simple, steeple & diagonal 16 inches (410 mm) and 49 inches (1,200 mm) x 48 inches (1,200 mm), single crank by A Campbell; Built for service on the North Wales coast but taken into the Seath & Steele fleet on the Clyde in 1866. Operated summer excursions to Ayr. Reboilered in 1869 and 1876. Sold to the Thames & Channel Steamship Company in 1881 and on to the London Steamboat Company in 1883. Scrapped in 1888 after her owners were taken over by the Victoria Steamboat Association.
Glen Rosa	1877	223	206.1 feet (62.8 m) x 20 feet (6.1 m)	Built by Caird & Co Engines : Simple diagonal 50 inches (1,300 mm) x 72 inches (1,800 mm) by Rowan; Built for service on the Clyde by the Shearer Brothers, for whom she sailed for four seasons on the Arran trade. Sold in 1881 to the Thames and Channel Steamship Company. Sailed along the Kent and East Anglian coasts and frequently visited the French ports of Calais, Boulogne-sur-Mer and Dunkerque. Despite a reputation for unreliability, she was purchased in 1883 by the London Steamboat Company. Financial problems led to the London Company putting its assets up for sale - they passed to the River Thames Steamboat Company. The River Thames company struggled financially itself and its fleet passed to the new Victoria Steamboat Association in 1888. Spent the 1892 season on charter to the Hastings, St Leonards-on-Sea and Eastbourne Steamboat Company on the South Coast. Inaugurated new service from Great Yarmouth to Harwich in 1893, connecting with Victoria's service from London by PS Koh-i-Noor. Stationed at Rochester on the Medway for the 1895 season as company finances had required a fleet retrenchment. At the end of the 1896 season, the fleet was sold off and Glen Rosa was bought by Captain Alexander Campbell. Transferred to P and A Campbell ownership in 1898 and stationed on the South Coast. Stationed at Brighton from 1903 to 1912. New funnel and round ports fitted in 1911. Laid up at Bristol in 1914 but reactivated for the Cardiff-Weston ferry in 1915 and 1916. Requisitioned for minesweeping duty in 1917, serving at Portland, Swansea and on the Thames. Returned to Bristol in May 1919, but laid up as reconditioning was not judged economical. Broken up by Pugsley at Bristol in 1921.
