= Gallions Reach =

Stretch of the Thames outside the East End of London

Coordinates: 51.504°N 0.082°E

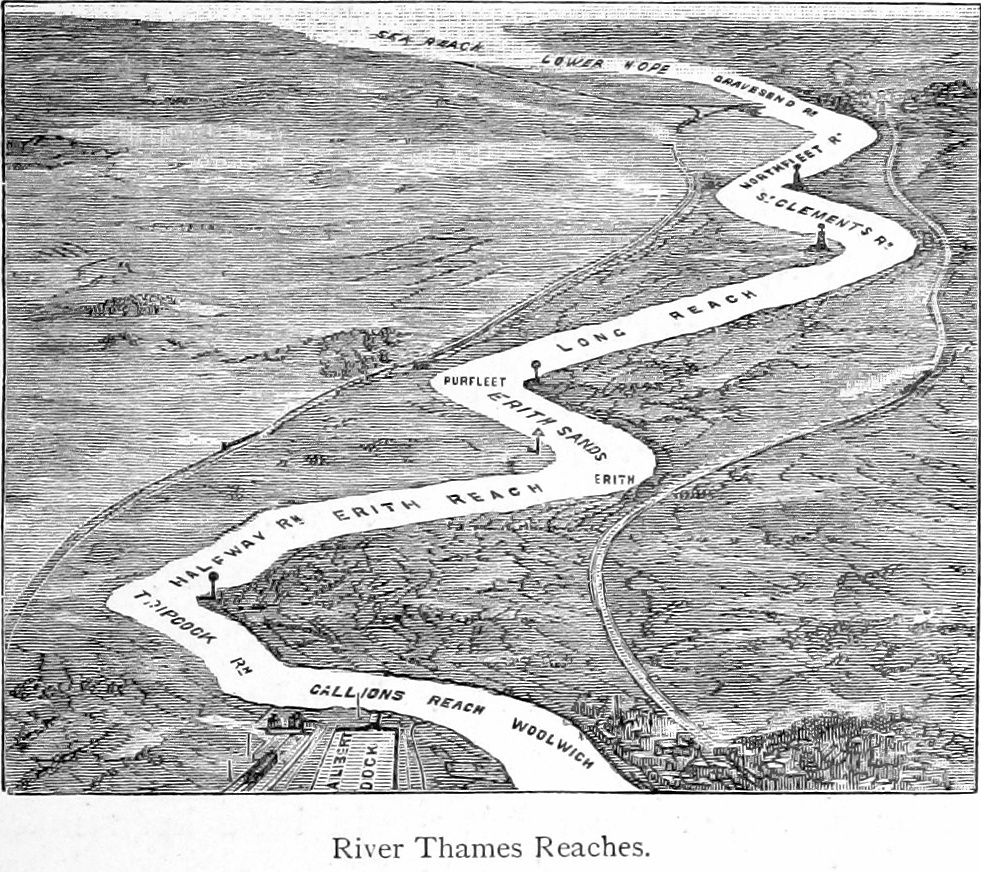
This 1884 aerial map, looking east, ascribes 10 names for stretches of the Thames Estuary (reaches) east of the first consistently named elsewhere, Gallions Reach. Many of the names and extents are in flux

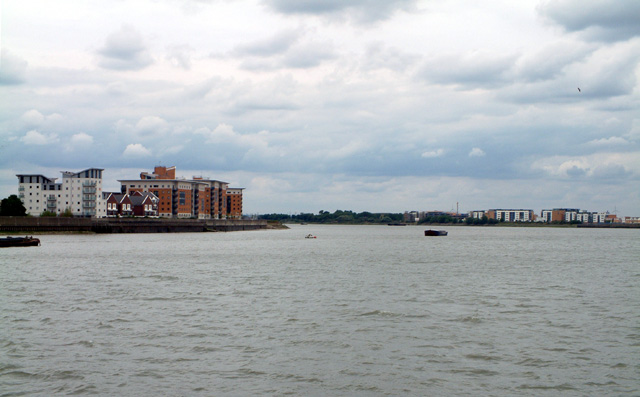
The eastern end of Gallions Reach

Gallions Reach is a stretch of the River Thames between Woolwich and Thamesmead. The area is named for the Galyons, a 14th-century family who owned property along this stretch of the river, and places, including street names, on both sides have been named after it.

== North side ==
North of the Thames in the London Borough of Newham, there is Gallions Reach Shopping Park and the DLR station.

== South side ==
South of the Thames in the London Borough of Greenwich, Gallions Hill is an area between the river and Western Way, close to Thamesmead town centre, Gallions Reach Park exists near the modern Thamesmead housing estate.

== Transport ==
Gallions was the eastern terminus station of the Eastern Counties and Thames Junction Railway from 1880 to 1940. Gallions Reach DLR station opened in 1994 on the route to Beckton.

There is a proposal for a river crossing at Gallions Reach.
