= Maltschacher See =

Lake in Austria

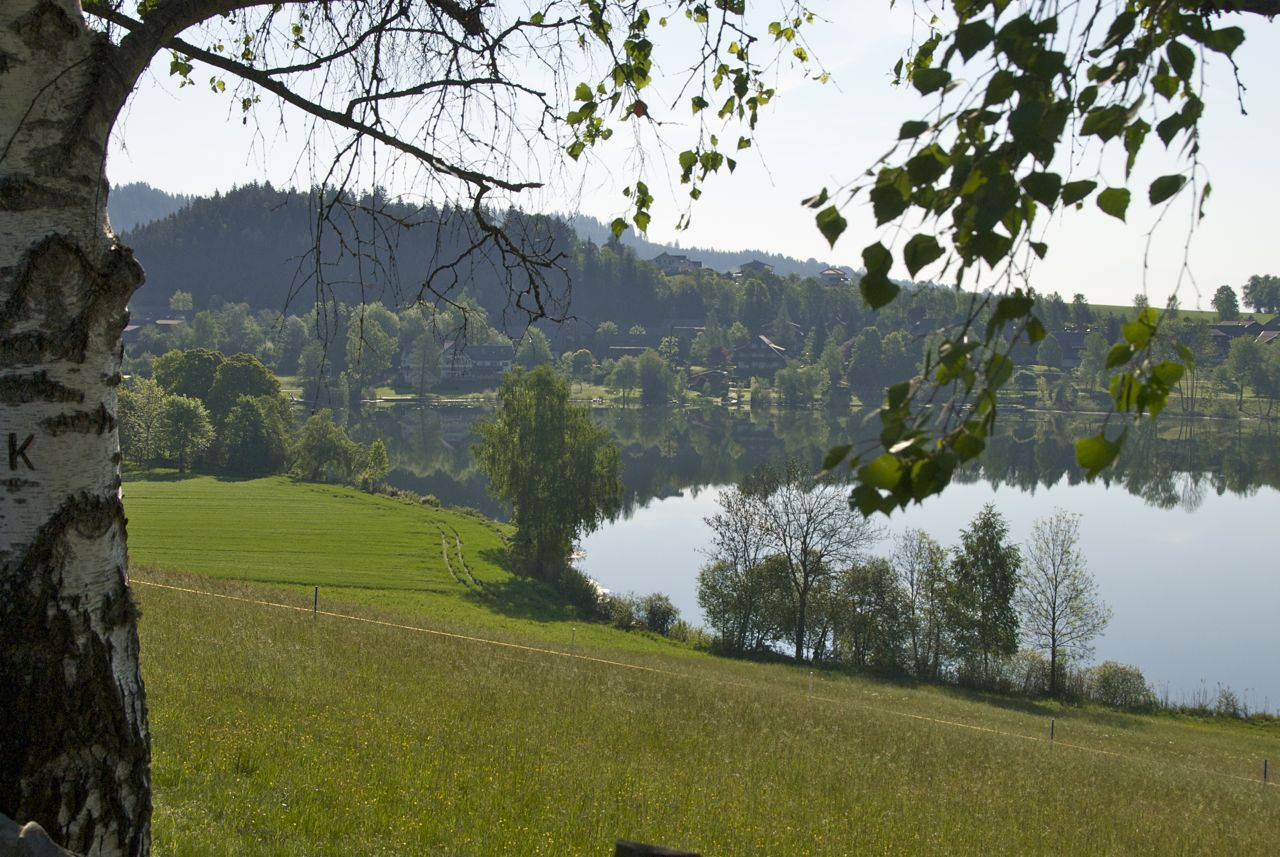

- Location within Kärnten
- Coordinates: 46°42′12″N 14°08′33″E
- Basin countries: Austria
- Surface area: 12.9 km^{2} (5.0 sq mi)
- Average depth: 6.7 m (22 ft)
- Surface elevation: 594 m (1,949 ft)
- Settlements: Feldkirchen in Kärnten

Maltschacher See is a lake in Carinthia, Austria, 5 kilometers south-east of Feldkirchen in Kärnten. A swamp is located on the western side of the lake. The outflow from the lake feeds the Strußnigteich, a breeding ground where carps are grown, four kilometers southeast of the Maltschacher See.

== Flora and fauna ==
The lake originally had a dense belt of reeds and aquatic plants. In 1975, the grass carp was introduced in the lake which destroyed both plants and reed belts. Since 1991, the grass carp is no longer observed. Fifteen fish species are presently living in the lake. The main species found are perch, bream, bleak, carp, tench and perch.

== Tourism ==
At the shore of the Maltschacher See is a campsite, a bungalow park and restaurants. In the vicinity are another campground and several guesthouses.

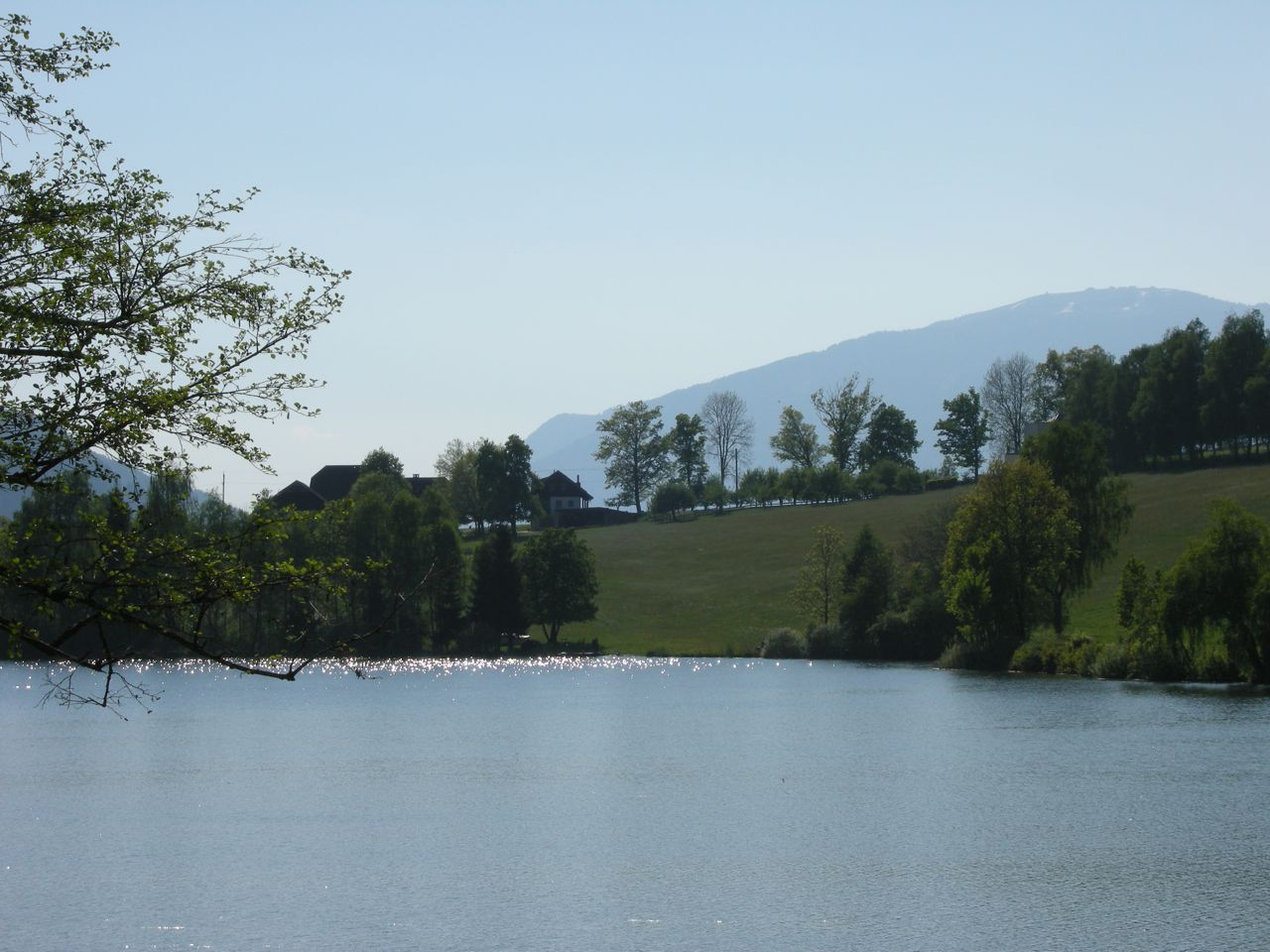
Maltschacher See uit het oosten

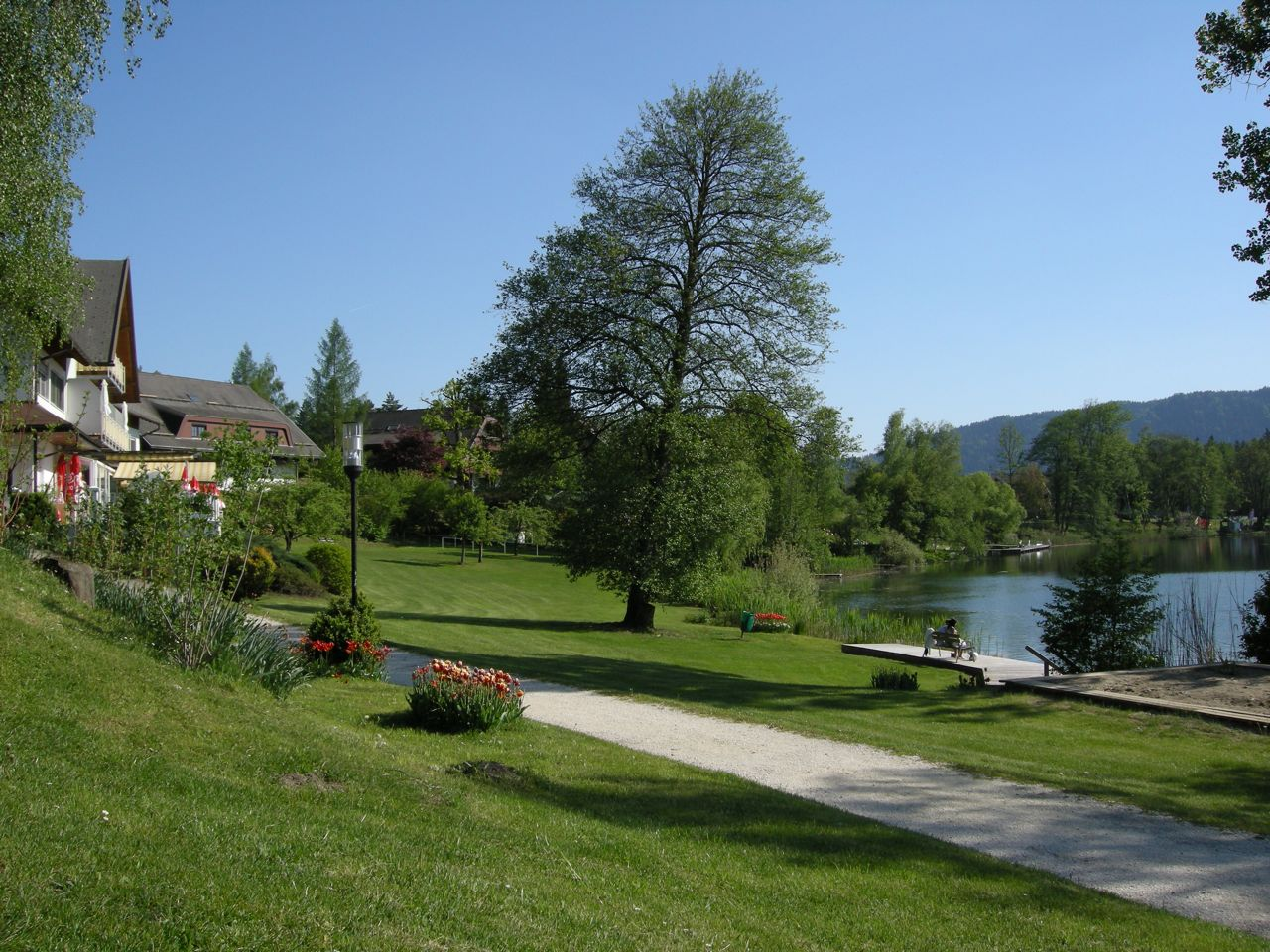
Maltschacher See, Gasthof
