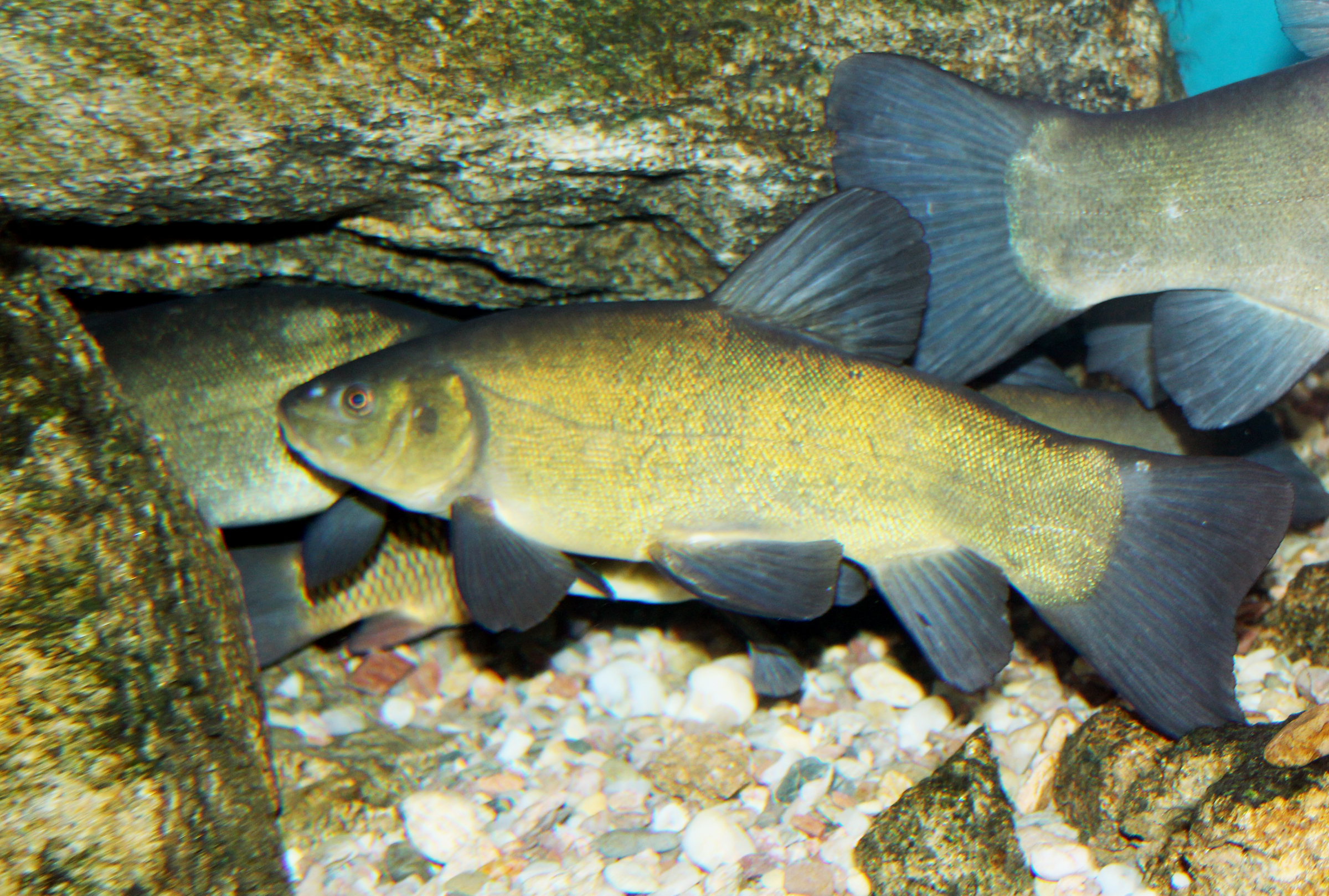
- Tench (Tinca tinca)
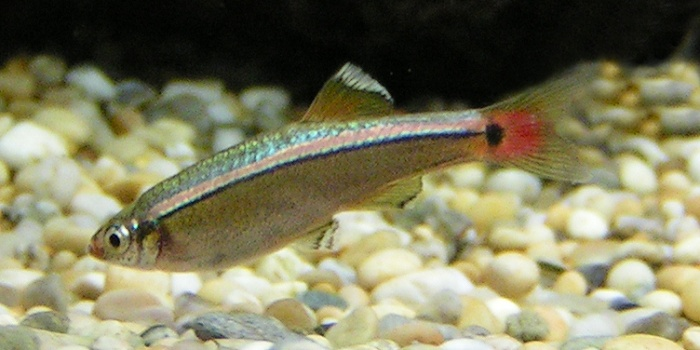
- White Cloud Mountain minnow (T. albonubes)

Scientific classification
- Domain: Eukaryota
- Kingdom: Animalia
- Phylum: Chordata
- Class: Actinopterygii
- Order: Cypriniformes
- Family: Cyprinidae
- Subfamily: Tincinae; Jordan, 1878

Genera
- see text

= Tincinae =

Subfamily of fishes

Tincinae is a doubtful subfamily of freshwater ray-finned fish from the family Cyprinidae, it consists of the tench of Eurasia and the east Asian clod minnows.

== Genera ==
There are two genera which are classified within the Tincinae, according to the 5th edition of the Fishes of the World, although in other classifications the subfamily is treated as either synonymous with other subfamilies within Cyprinidae or as a family in its own right. These also give differing statuses to Tanichthys.

- Tanichthys S. Y. Lin, 1932 (mountain or cardinal minnows)
- Tinca, Garsault 1764 (tench)

As of January 2024, WoRMS has Tinca listed under Tincidae,Tanichthys under Xenocypridinae, and considers this rank to be invalid.
