= Swan pit =

Water-filled enclosure historically used to house swans for meat

A swan pit is a water-filled enclosure where swans were fattened and eventually killed for human consumption.

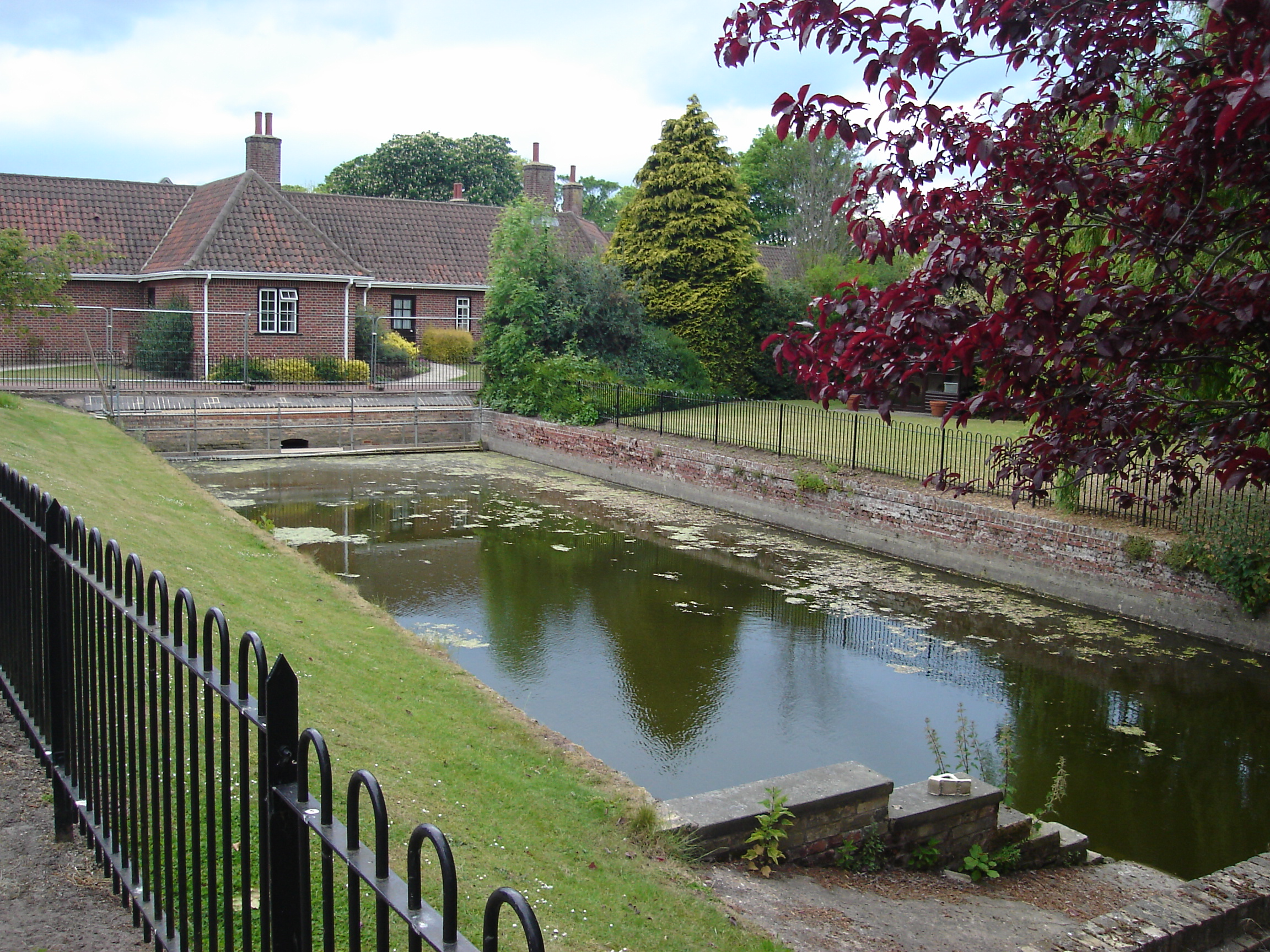
The swan pit at the Great Hospital, Norwich

== History ==
From the medieval period swans were kept in ponds and were a source of income and made acceptable gifts. Selected wild cygnets had their wings clipped and bills cut into a distinctive pattern bearing the owner's mark.

An example of a swan pit can be found within the grounds of the Great Hospital, Norwich. The Grade II listed tidal pool was built in the 18th century and is fed with water from the adjacent River Wensum.
