= Strußnigteich =

Private carp pond in Austria

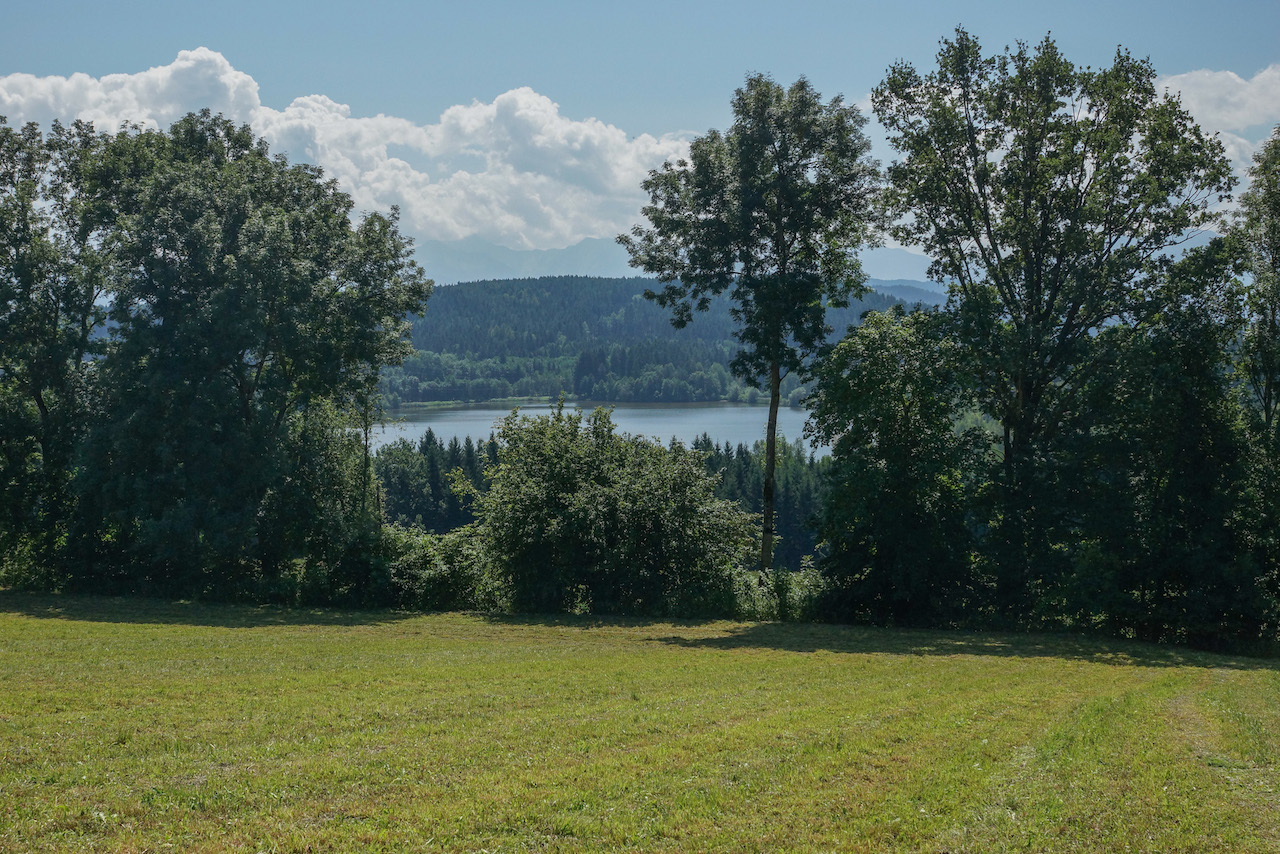

- Location within Austria
- Location: Klagenfurt-Land District, Carinthia, Austria
- Coordinates: 46°41′07″N 14°10′12″E
- Type: lake
- Primary inflows: Lake Maltschach
- Primary outflows: Rosenauer Bach
- Surface area: 26 hectares (64 acres)
- Average depth: 1.7 metres (6 ft)
- Max. depth: 7.8 metres (26 ft)
- Surface elevation: 554 metres (1,818 ft)

Strußnigteich is a pond in the municipality of Feldkirchen in Carinthia, Austria. It covers an area of 26 hectares (64 acres) and is used for carp farming. It is privately owned and not accessible to the general public.

== Description ==
The pond was probably created in the 18th century when a wet surface was dammed. It is 26 hectares (64 acres) in size and has an average depth of 1.7 metres (6 ft). The greatest depth is 7.8 metres (26 ft). In addition to common carp, the pond contains a number of species of fish: tench, pike, perch, crucian carp, zander, grass and silver carp. In the early 1990s, the pseudo-harlequin barb (Pseudorasbora parva) was introduced from the Danube Delta.

The hills around the pond are surrounded by cultivated areas, fields and meadows as well as spruce monocultures. There is an extensive thicket of reeds on the eastern edge of the pond.

A myriad of small animals such as dragonflies and butterflies live on the edges of the pond. Breeding birds include the tufted duck, pochard, lapwing, and little ringed plover, which are rare species in Carinthia. The pond is of particular importance as a resting place for migratory birds, because such habitats are rare in Central Carinthia.

Carp are farmed in the pond, and are harvested at the end of October with the help of volunteers from a fishing club.

== Protected areas ==
The pond was placed under nature protection in 1979. The Strußnigteich nature reserve covers 375 hectares (930 acres) in the communities of Feldkirchen and Moosburg. In the same year, a strip of 166 hectares (410 acres) around the nature reserve was placed under landscape protection.

== See also ==
- Lakes of Carinthia
