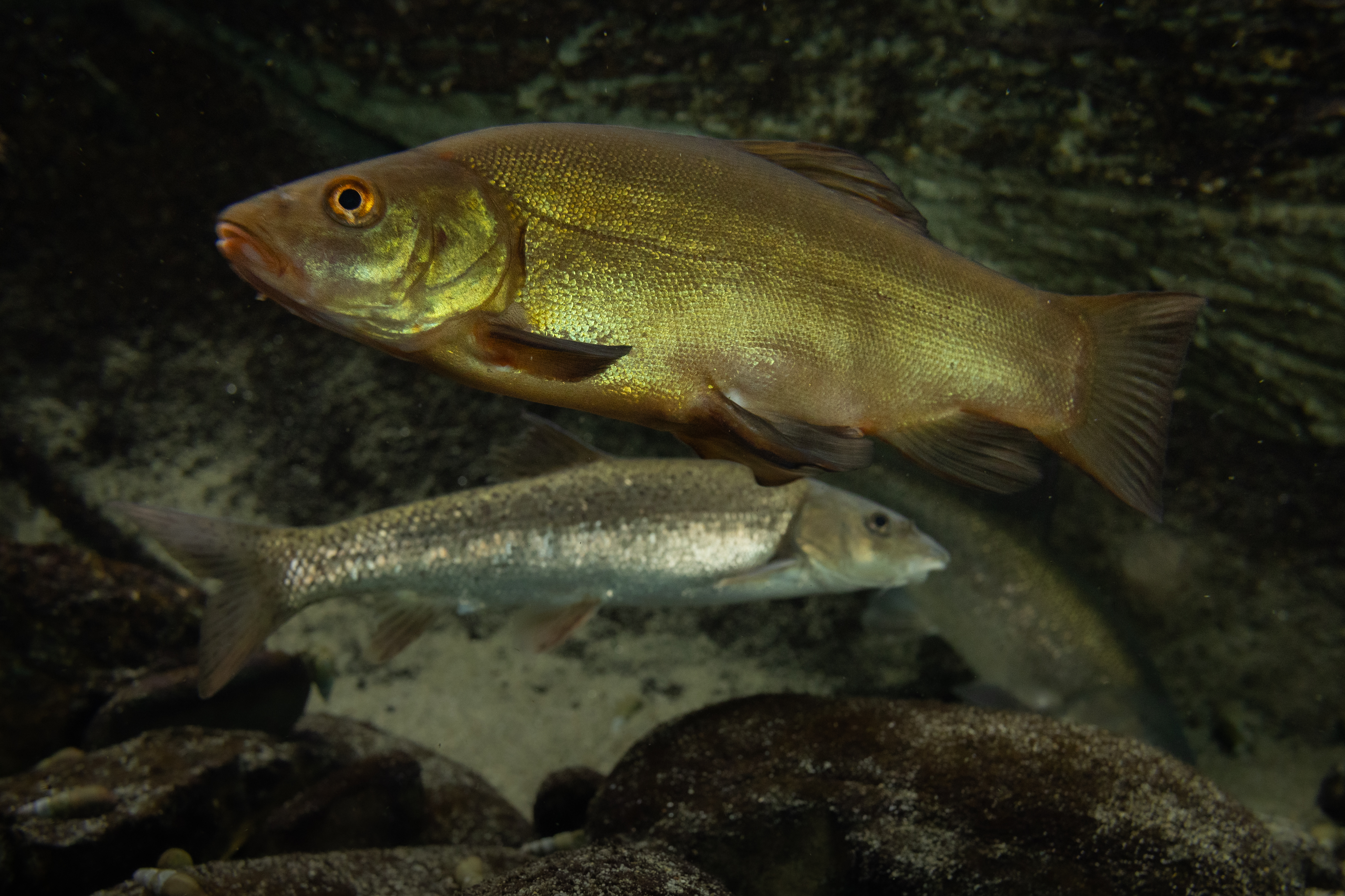

Conservation status
- Least Concern (IUCN 3.1)

Scientific classification
- Kingdom: Animalia
- Phylum: Chordata
- Class: Actinopterygii
- Division: Teleostei
- Order: Cypriniformes
- Suborder: Cyprinoidei
- Family: Tincidae; Jordan, 1878
- Genus: Tinca; Garsault, 1764
- Species: T. tinca

Binomial name
- Tinca tinca (Linnaeus, 1758)

Synonyms
- List: Tinca aurea Gmelin, 1788; Cyprinus tinca Linnaeus, 1758; Cyprinus tincaauratus Bloch, 1782; Cyprinus zeelt Lacépède, 1803; Cyprinus tincaurea Shaw, 1804; Tinca vulgaris Fleming, 1828; Tinca chrysitis Fitzinger, 1832; Tinca italica Bonaparte, 1836; Tinca communis Swainson, 1839; Tinca limosa Koch, 1840; Tinca linnei Malm, 1877

= Tench =

Tench Temporal range: Late Oligocene–present

Species of ray-finned fish

The tench or doctor fish (Tinca tinca) is a fresh- and brackish-water fish of the order Cypriniformes found throughout Eurasia from Western Europe including Britain and Ireland east into Asia as far as the Ob and Yenisei Rivers. It is also found in Lake Baikal. It normally inhabits slow-moving freshwater habitats, particularly lakes and lowland rivers.

== Taxonomy ==
The tench was first formally described in as Cyprinus tinca by Carl Linnaeus in 1758 in the 10th edition of Systema Naturae with its type locality given as "European lakes". In 1764 François Alexandre Pierre de Garsault proposed the new monospecific genus Tinca, with Cyprinus tinca as the type species by absolute tautonymy. The 5th edition of Fishes of the World classified Tinca in the subfamily Tincinae, alongside the genus Tanichthys, while other authorities classified both these genera in the subfamily Leuciscinae with other Eurasian minnows, but more recent phylogenetic studies have supported it belonging to its own family Tincidae. The Tincidae was first proposed as a name in 1878 by David Starr Jordan.

=== Evolution ===
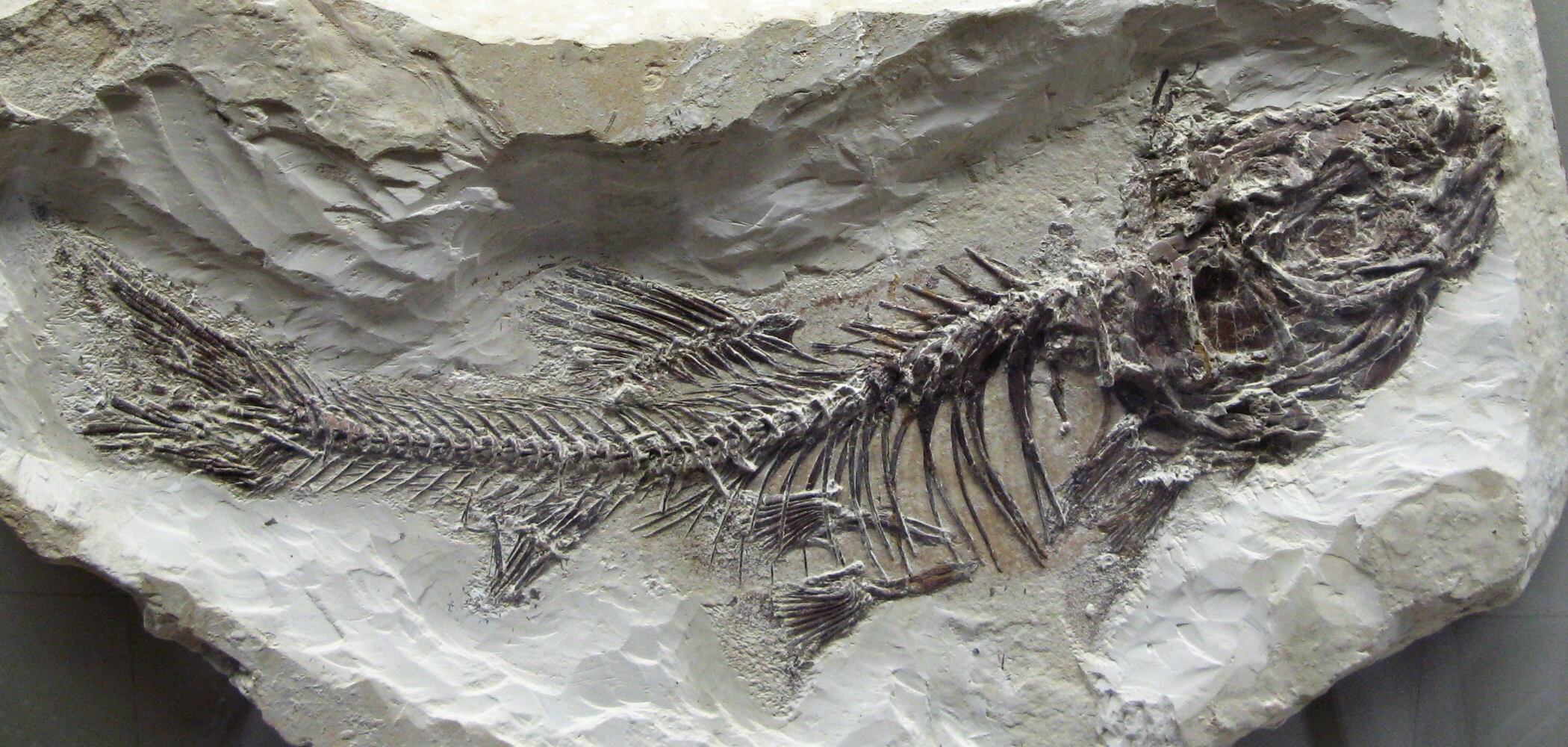
Fossil specimen of Tinca furcata

The Tincidae have a rather comprehensive fossil record in Europe. They first appear during the Late Oligocene with the fossil genera †Tarsichthys Troschel, 1854 and the potentially synonymous †Palaeotinca Obrhelová, 1969.

For the extant Tinca, the fossil species †Tinca furcata Agassiz, 1832 is known from Late Miocene-aged deposits near Ohningen, and the contemporaneous †Tinca micropygoptera Agassiz, 1839 is known from near Steinheim am Albuch. The extinct species †Tinca sayanica Sytchevskaya, 1989 is known from the Late Miocene or Early Pliocene of Mongolia. †Tinca pliocenica Gaudant, 1998 is known from the Pliocene of Germany. From the Late Miocene onwards, Tinca remains are overall widespread in freshwater deposits of Europe and West Asia, although they are usually not assignable to species. The earliest remains of the modern Tinca tinca are from the late Pliocene of the Netherlands.

== Ecology ==
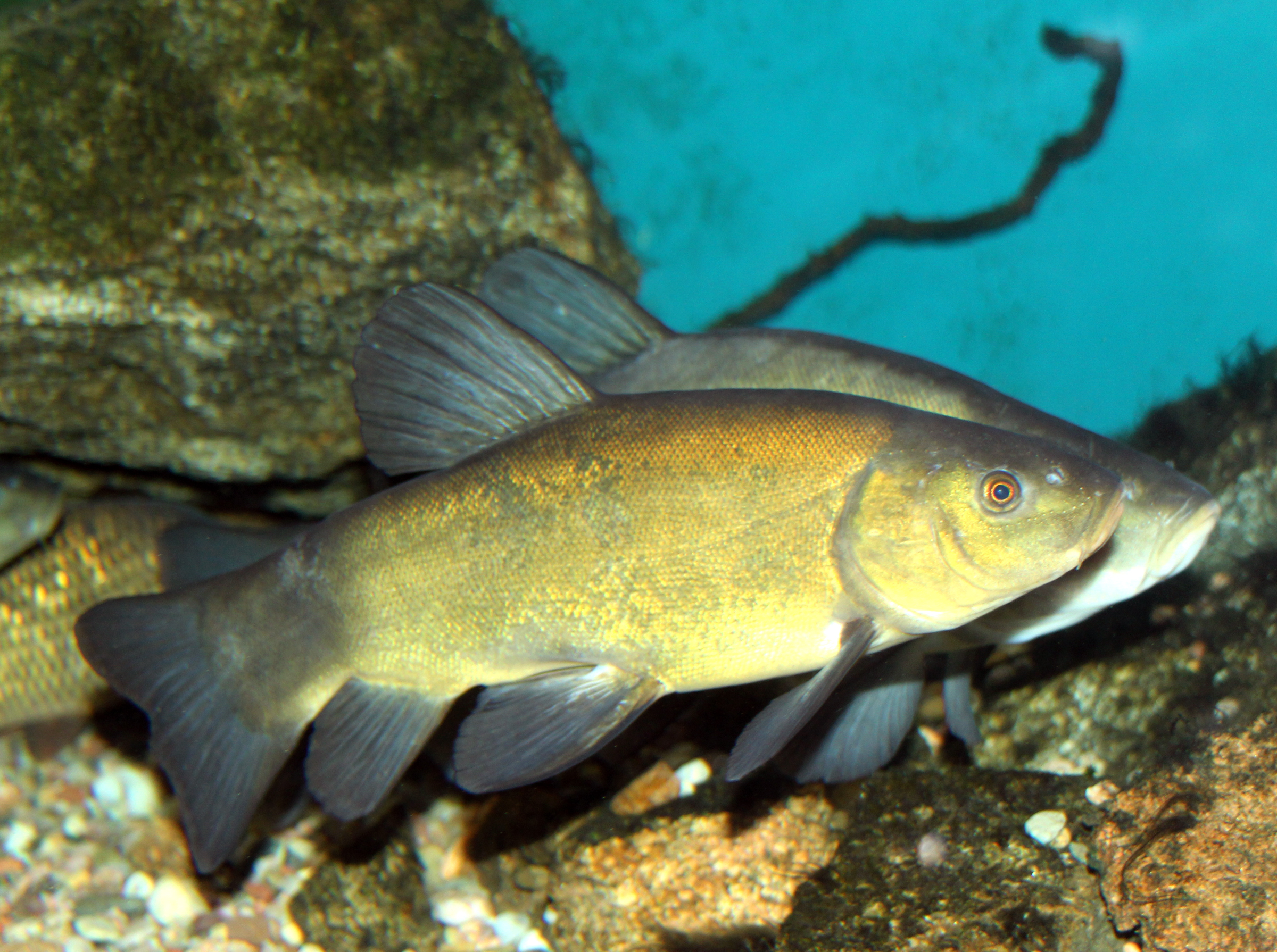
On exhibition, in Prague

The tench is most often found in still waters with a clay or muddy substrate and abundant vegetation. This species is rare in clear waters across stony substrate, and is absent altogether from fast-flowing streams. It tolerates water with a low oxygen concentration, being found in waters where even the carp cannot survive.

Tench feed mostly at night with a preference for animals, such as chironomids, on the bottom of eutrophic waters and snails and pea clams in well-vegetated waters.

Breeding takes place in shallow water usually among aquatic plants where the sticky green eggs can be deposited. Spawning usually occurs in summer, and as many as 300,000 eggs may be produced. Growth is rapid, and fish may reach a weight of 0.11 kg (0.25 lb) within the first year.

== Morphology ==
Tench have a stocky, carp-like shape and olive-green skin, darker above and almost golden below. The tail fin is square in shape. The other fins are distinctly rounded in shape. The mouth is rather narrow and provided at each corner with a very small barbel.

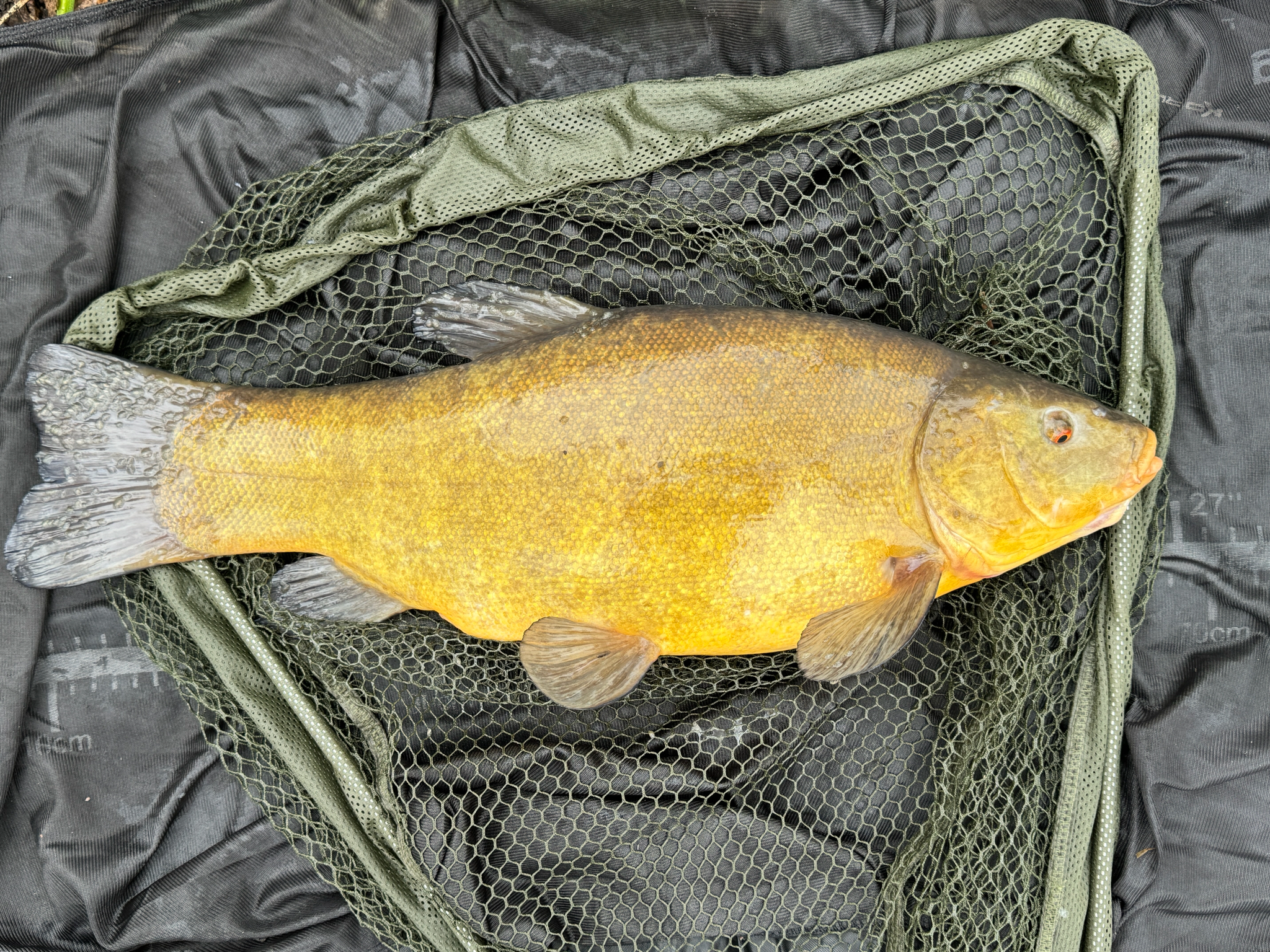
In England

Maximum size is 70 cm (28 in), though most specimens are much smaller. A record fish caught in 2001 in England had a weight of 15 lb 3.4 oz (6.899 kg). The eyes are small and red-orange in colour. Females can reach weights of around 7 kg (15 lb), although 4 kg (8.8 lb) is considered large. Males rarely reach over 3 kg (6.5 lb). Sexual dimorphism is strong, males can be recognised by having larger, more curved pelvic fins extending beyond the anus and noticeable muscles around the base of these fins generally absent in females. Males also possess a very thick and flattened outer ray to the ventral fins. Adult females may have a more convex ventral profile when compared with males.

The tench has very small scales, which are deeply embedded in a thick skin, making it as slippery as an eel. Folklore has it that this slime cured any sick fish that rubbed against it, and from this belief arose the name doctor fish.

== Golden tench ==
An artificially bred variety of tench called the golden tench is a popular ornamental fish for ponds. This form varies in colour from pale gold through to dark red, and some fish have black or red spots on the flanks and fins. Though somewhat similar to the goldfish, because these fish have such small scales, their quality is rather different.

== Economic significance ==
Tench are edible, working well in recipes that would otherwise call for carp, but are not commonly consumed. They are shoaling fish that are popular quarries for coarse angling in rivers, lakes and canals. Tench, particularly golden tench, are also kept as ornamental fish in ponds as they are bottom feeders that help to keep the waterways clean and healthy.

== Angling ==
Large tench may be found in gravel pits or deep, slow-moving waters with a clay or silt bottom and copious aquatic vegetation. The best methods and bait to catch tench are float fishing and ledgering with a swim feeder using maggots, sweetcorn, pellets, bread, and worms. Fish over 1 kg (2 lb) in weight are very strong fighters when caught on a rod.
