= François Alexandre Pierre de Garsault =

French botanist, zoologist and painter

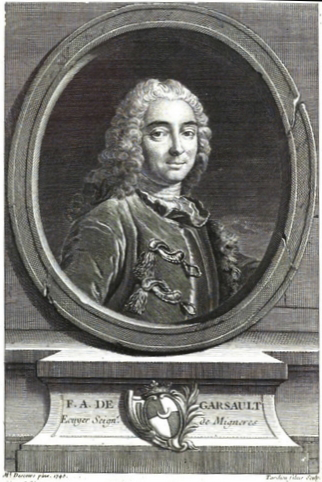

François Alexandre Pierre de Garsault was a French botanist, zoologist and painter. de Garsault was born on 16 April 1691 in Aix-en-Provence, France and died on 3 August 1778 in Paris, France. de Garsault was a member of the French Academy of Sciences.
