= George Porter (architect) =

English architect

George Porter (c. 1795/96 – 1856) was an English architect, based in Bermondsey, then part of Surrey, in the early- to mid-nineteenth-century.

== Life and career ==
Porter was appointed district surveyor to the parishes of St. Mary Magdalen, Bermondsey, and St. Mary, Rotherhithe, Surrey, in 1824. He still held the posts in 1832, when he gave his address as Fort Place, Bermondsey.

He exhibited at the Royal Academy in 1815 and between 1834 and 1837. Works he showed there included "Design for a Museum" (1815), "Villa in Surrey" (1834), "Villa on Brighton road" (1835) and "London Leather warehouse" (1837).

He died in 1856. At the time of his death he was described as district surveyor of Newington and the central division of Lambeth.

== Works ==
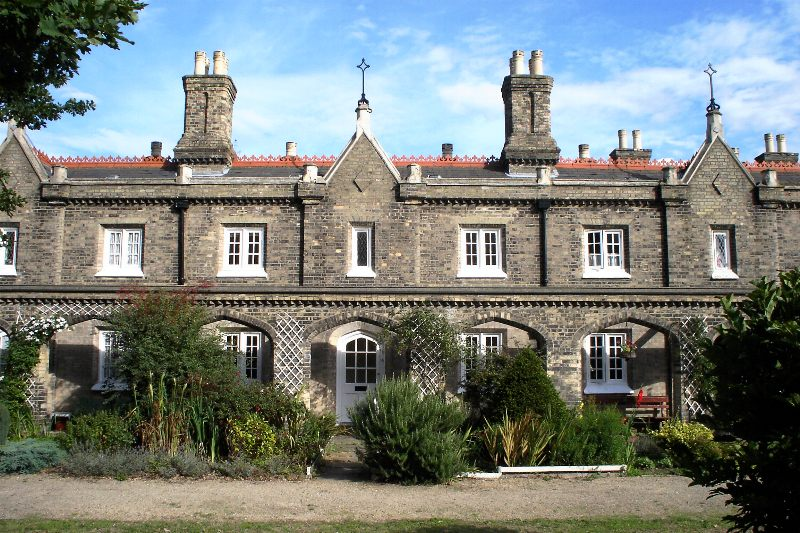
The Free Watermen and Lightermen's Almshouses, Beckenham Road, Penge.

- Porter was responsible for the alterations to the west end and tower of the parish church of St Mary Magdalen, Bermondsey, carried out in 1830, which gave them their present "Gothick" appearance. He also restored the medieval west window.
- The Free Watermen and Lightermen's Almshouses (generally known as the "Royal Watermen's Almshouses") on Beckenham Road, Penge, Kent, were built in "Tudor" style to Porter's designs in 1840-1 by the Company of Watermen and Lightermen of the City of London for retired company Freemen and their widows. It is the most prominent and oldest of the Victorian almshouses in Penge. In 1973, the almspeople were moved to a new site in Hastings, and the original buildings converted into private homes.
