= The Thames Barge Driving Race =

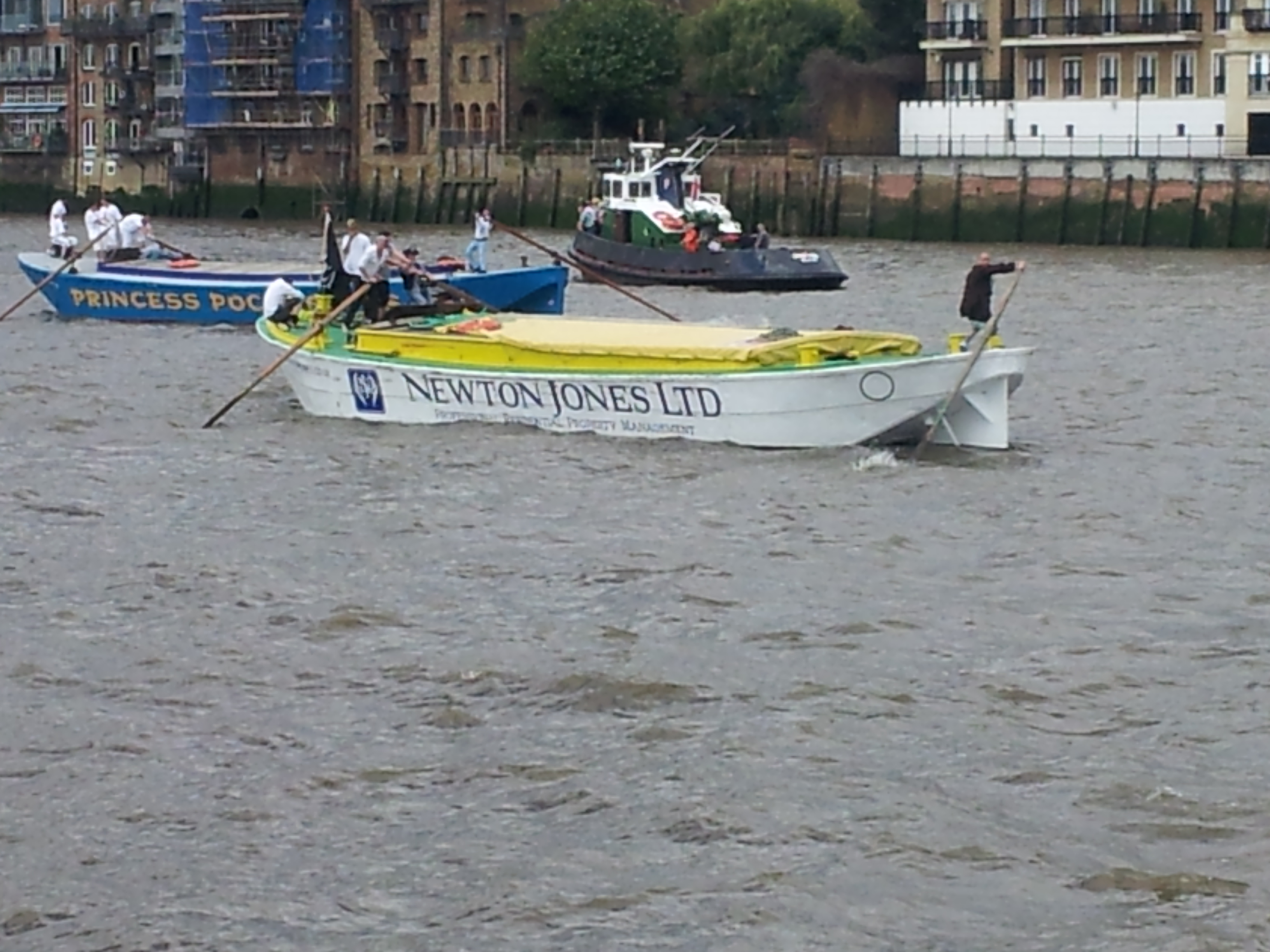
Barge Race.

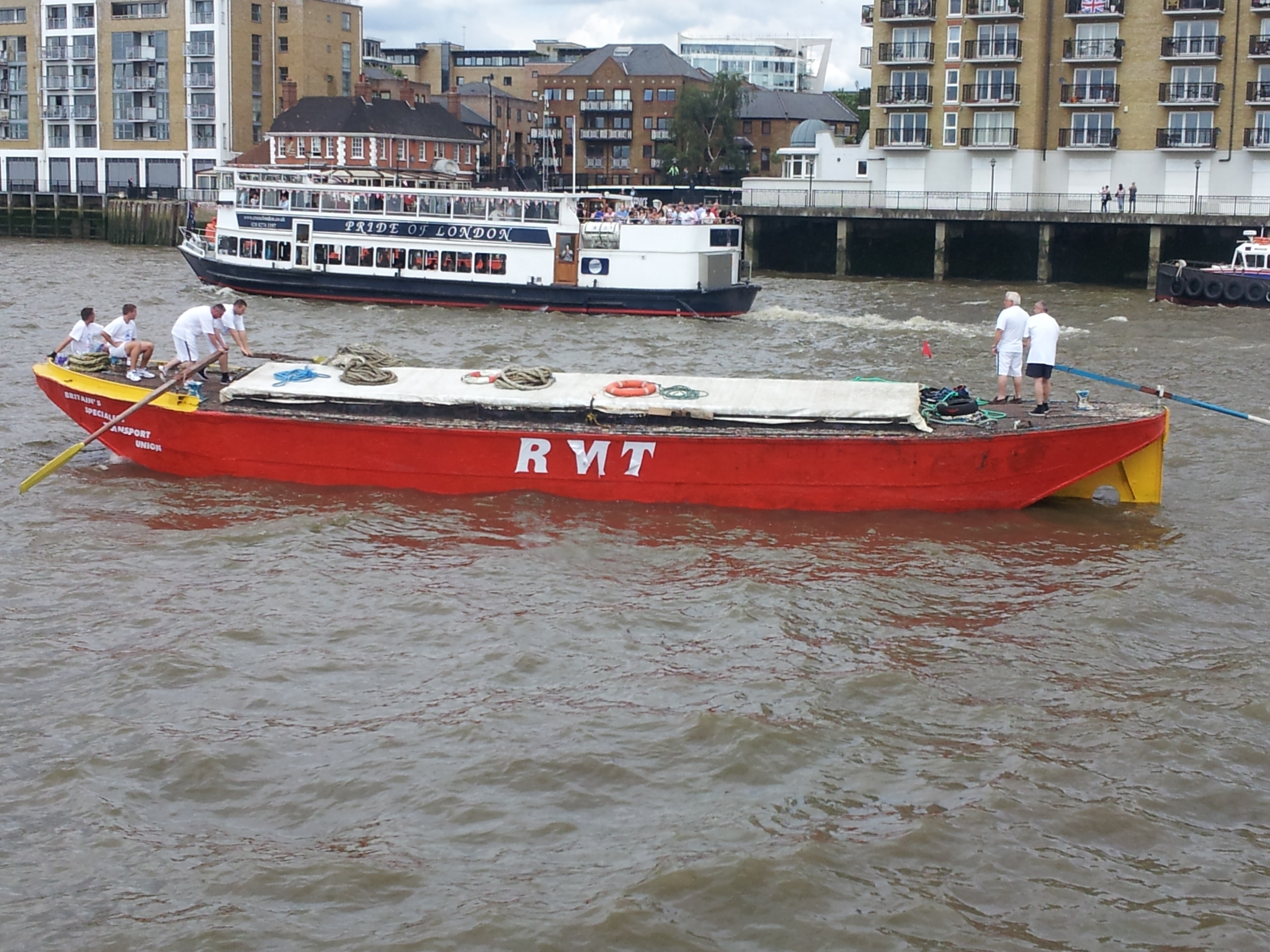

The Thames Barge Driving Race or Barge Race is a river-race that was set up in 1975 by a charity called The Transport On Water Association (TOW), founder members being Jack Faram, Jonnie McSweeney, Ron Livett, Don Able and Peter House (all working Thames Lighterman at the time), now known as the Thames Barge Driving Trust with the backing of Members of Parliament and Members of the House of Lords in the United Kingdom.

== The race ==
The race consists of about 11 teams of between four and eight members who steer and row 30 ton barges over a seven-mile course for about 90 minutes from Greenwich to Westminster Bridge. Considerable skill is needed to pilot unpowered barges 'rowed under oars' or sweeps and ride tidal river currents alone, up river. The event commemorates the skills of lightermen who moved freight this way along the Thames up until the 1930s and in a wider context it encourages ongoing interest in moving cargo via water and as a way to recruit younger people back into river trades.
The teams are normally made up of employees of Thames lighterage companies, Port of London Authority or are sponsored by local businesses.

The best places to view the race are Tower Bridge, London Bridge and Westminster Bridge.

== Historical context ==
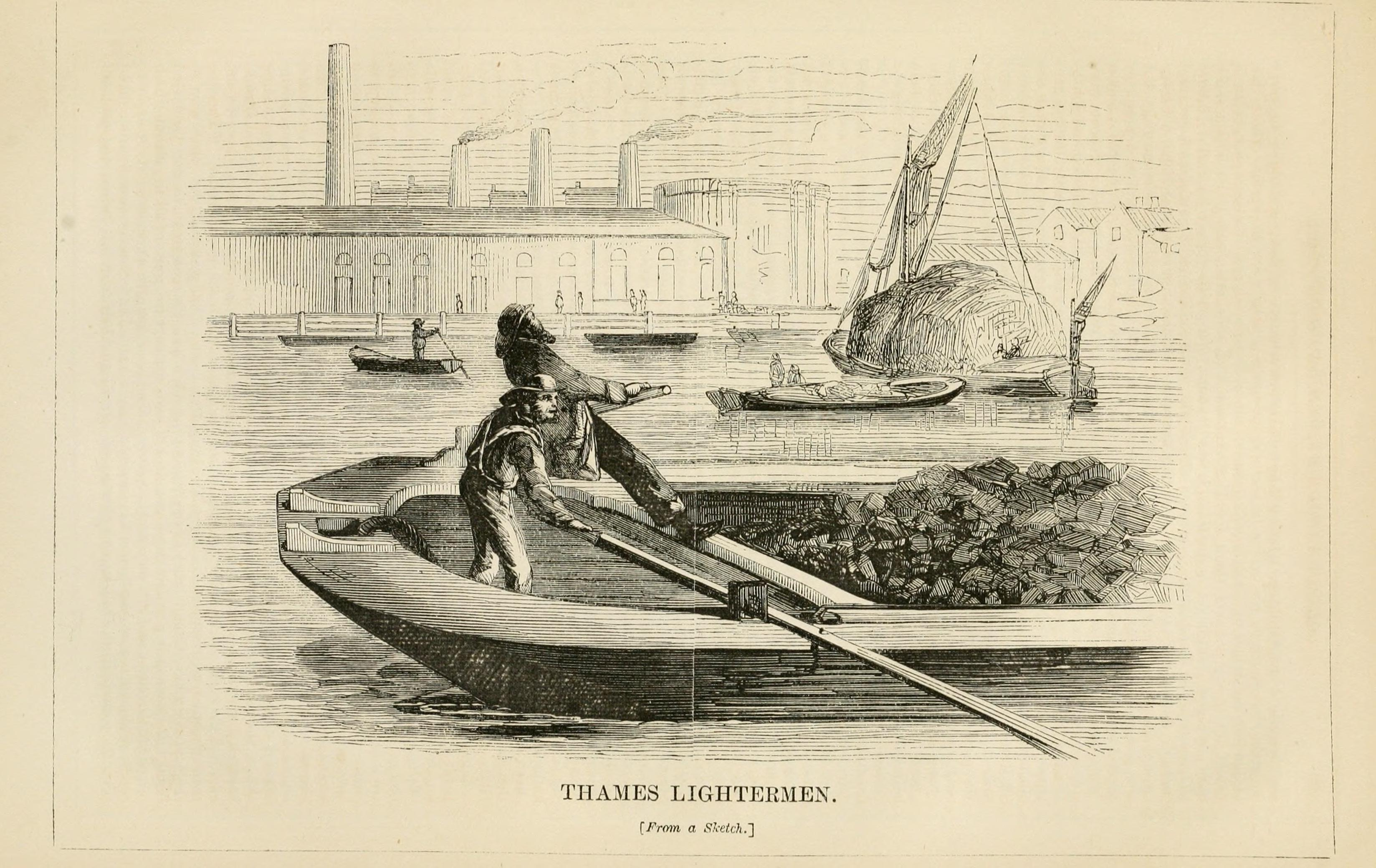
An 1861 engraving of Thames lightermen driving a barge.

During the 1970s Britain suffered a major energy crisis and many politicians in the UK and US were astutely looking at alternative ways to transport freight in ways that could reduce dependency on oil. The decline of the British Empire and the opening of Tilbury docks caused the closure of the upriver docks on the river Thames and started a steep decline in traditional London lighterage which had transported large amounts of coal. Between 1967 and 1976 over 40 lighterage firms closed down. At the same time the UKs domestic central heating market emerged oil quickly replacing coal. The race thus reflected a more pragmatic political ethos and was a way of keeping alive a dying industry and its river skills as the energy crisis deepened further.

== Other river races on the tidal Thames ==
- Thames Sailing Barge Match
- Doggett's Coat and Badge
- Shrimpers Regatta
- Great River Race
- Devizes to Westminster International Canoe Marathon
- The University Boat Race
- Head of the River Race
- Women's Eights Head of the River Race
- Schools' Head of the River Race
- Veterans' Head of the River Race
- Head of the River Fours
- Veteran Fours' Head
- Pairs Head
- Scullers Head of the River Race
- Wingfield Sculls
- Hammersmith Head
- Quintin Head
- Southend Barge Match
- Putney Town Regatta
- Barnes and Mortlake Regatta
- Bourne at Chiswick Regatta
- Hammersmith Regatta
- Richmond Regatta
- Twickenham Regatta

== See also ==
- Lightermen
- Watermen
- Thames sailing barge
- Thames Ton
- Foster Yeoman
- Cory Environmental
