= The Coat & Badge, Putney =

Pub in London

Coordinates: 51.46450°N 0.2166209°W

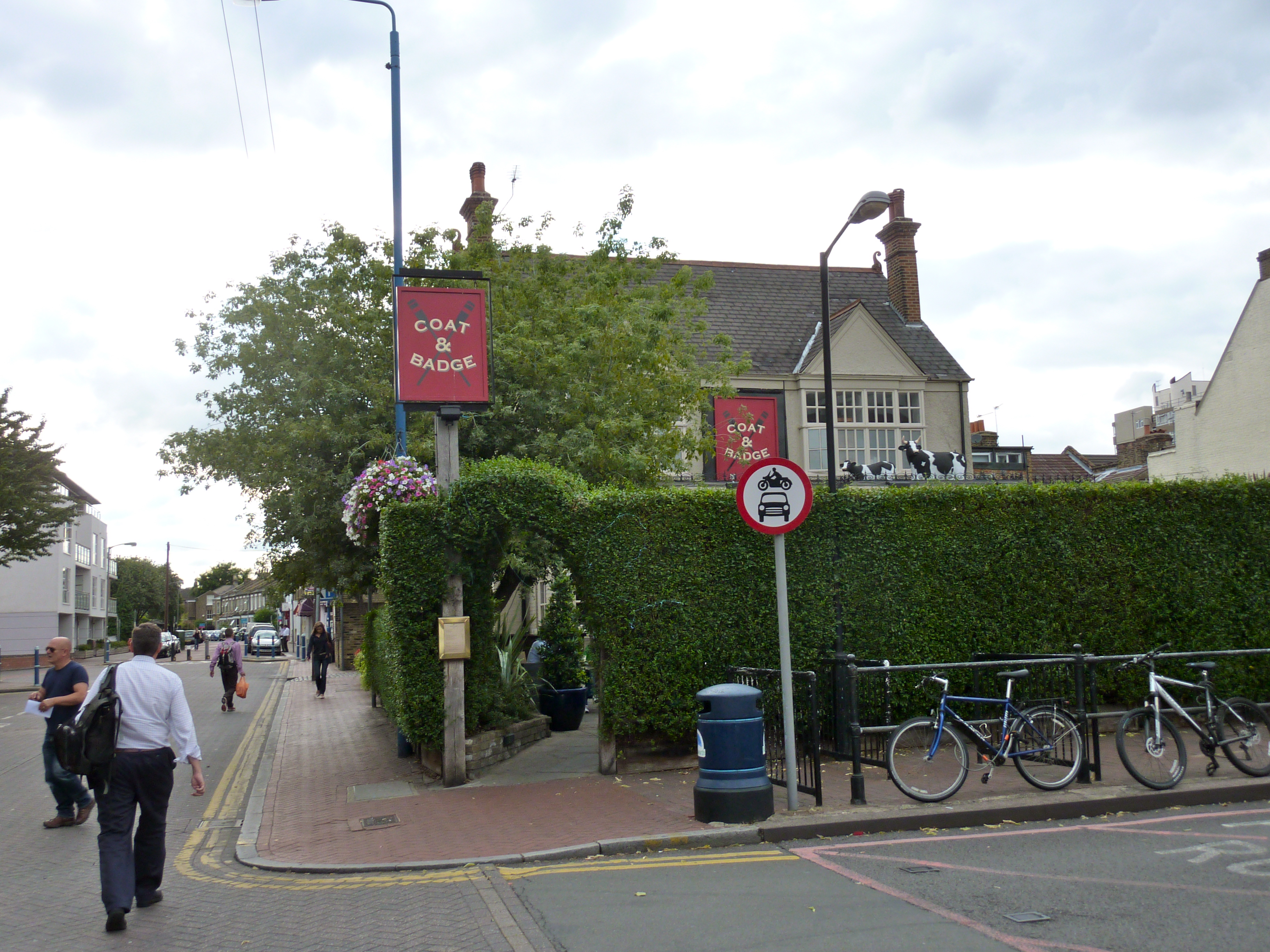
Exterior view

The Coat & Badge is a pub in Putney, London, England.

== Location ==
The pub is on the northern side of Lacy Road at number 8, on the corner with Walker's Place, and there is an outdoor garden.

== History ==
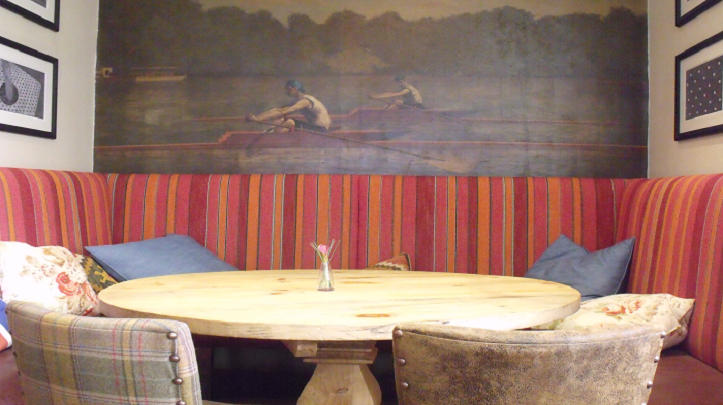
Interior of The Coat & Badge, with rowing artwork.

The pub dates from the Edwardian era, it was recorded at Coopers Lane which is now Lacy Road. The name is after Doggett's Coat and Badge, the oldest rowing race in the world, started by Irish comedian Thomas Doggett and now run by the Watermen's Company.

== Management ==
The pub was managed by Geronimo, along with the nearby Half Moon, but is now managed by Young & Co who took over the Geronimo chain in 2010.
