= Knollys Rose Ceremony =

Annual event in London, England

Coordinates: 51°30′36″N 0°4′45″W

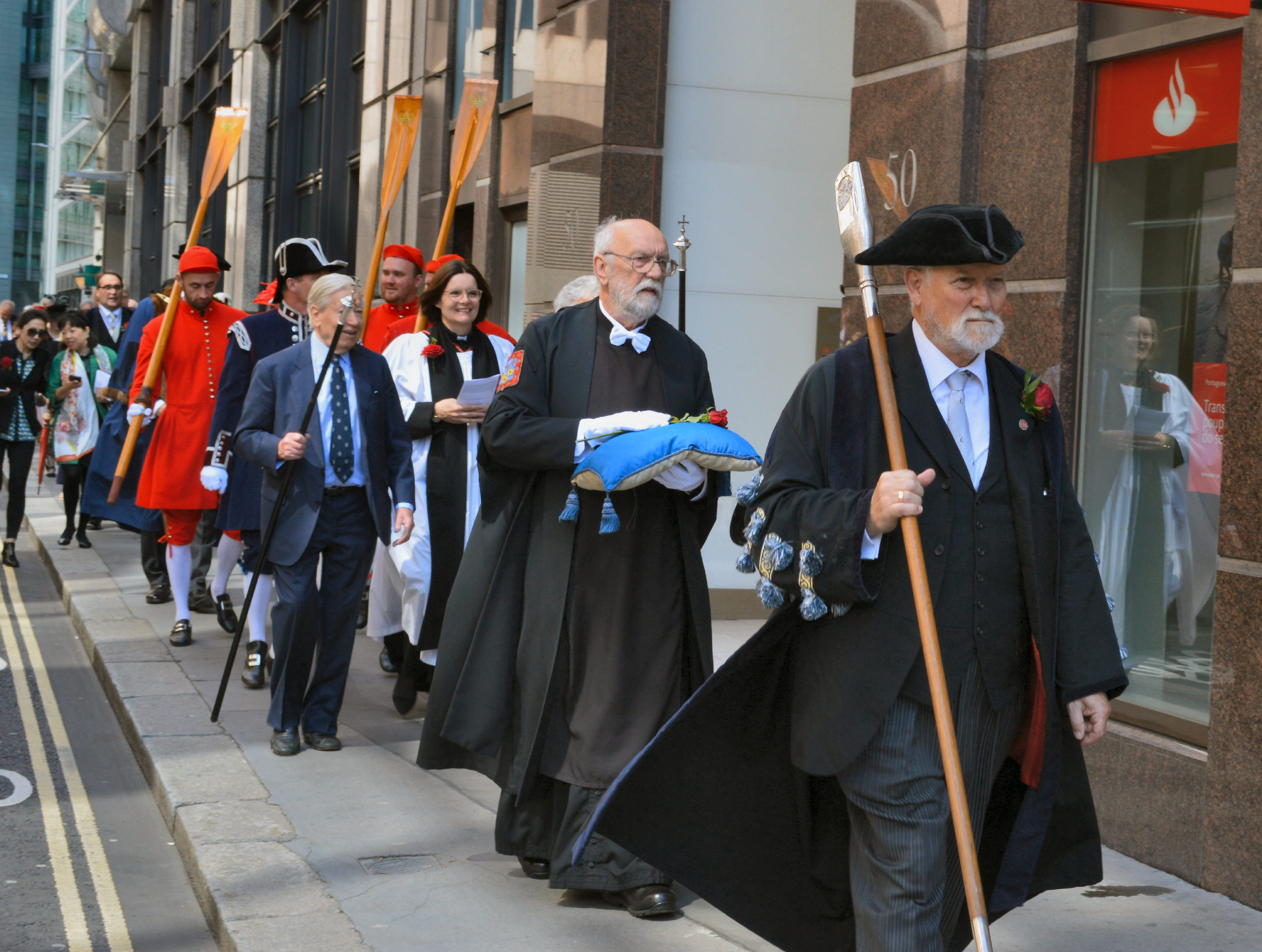
The Knollys Rose procession

The Knollys Rose Ceremony is an annual event led by the Company of Watermen and Lightermen. The ceremony dates to 1381 and is held each year in June. A single red rose is snipped from the garden in Seething Lane, placed on an altar cushion from All Hallows-by-the-Tower and carried in procession west to the Mansion House where it is presented to the Lord Mayor of London.

== History ==
Sir Robert Knolles (c. 1325 – 15 August 1407) was an important English knight of the Hundred Years' War and was a prominent citizen of London. He owned a house on the West side of 'Syendenlane in the Parish of All Hallows Berkying-churche', now called Seething Lane. While he was away, possibly in 1380, his wife, Constance, purchased the threshing ground on the East side of the road opposite their house and turned it into a rose garden. She then built a footbridge over the lane from her house to her garden. The Corporation of London imposed a fine of one red rose payable each year on the feast of St. John the Baptist. The Lord Mayor at the time was Sir William Walworth. The official record says

"To all persons who these present letters shall see or hear, the Mayor Aldermen and Commonalty of the City of London Greeting, know ye that we have granted unto Messire Robert Knolles Knight, our dear and well beloved fellow citizen, and to Constance his wife, leave to make a Haut-pas of the height of 14 feet extending from the house of the said Robert and Constance his wife on the west side thereof to another house to them belonging on the east side thereof, beyond the lane of Syvendenlane in the parish of All Hallows Berkyngechirche, near the Tower of London, rendering yearly to the Chamberlain of the Guild Hall of the said City for the time being one red rose at the feast of St. John the Baptist."

== The ceremony ==
The ceremony continues as one of the City's traditions. The Company of Watermen and Lightermen is based at its Hall at St Mary-at-Hill and organises the ceremony. It starts at All Hallows-by-the-Tower and makes its way to the garden at Seething Lane where the rose is cut. It is then placed on an altar cushion and carried in procession to the Mansion House where it is presented to the Lord Mayor. The escort for the rose consists of the Master of the Company, the Verger of All Hallows-by-the-Tower accompanied by the Vicar, Churchwardens, and Beadle and optionally by a few company members in period dress each holding an old-style oar.

The ceremony was revived in 1924 by the Vicar of All Hallows-by-the-Tower and has been arranged by the Company of Watermen and Lighters since 1960.

The garden in Seething Lane, which has connections with Samuel Pepys, was owned by the Port of London Authority and reopened in 2018 as part of the redevelopment of Trinity Square. Rainwater from the roof of 10 Trinity Square is used for the garden's irrigation. It has a car park beneath.

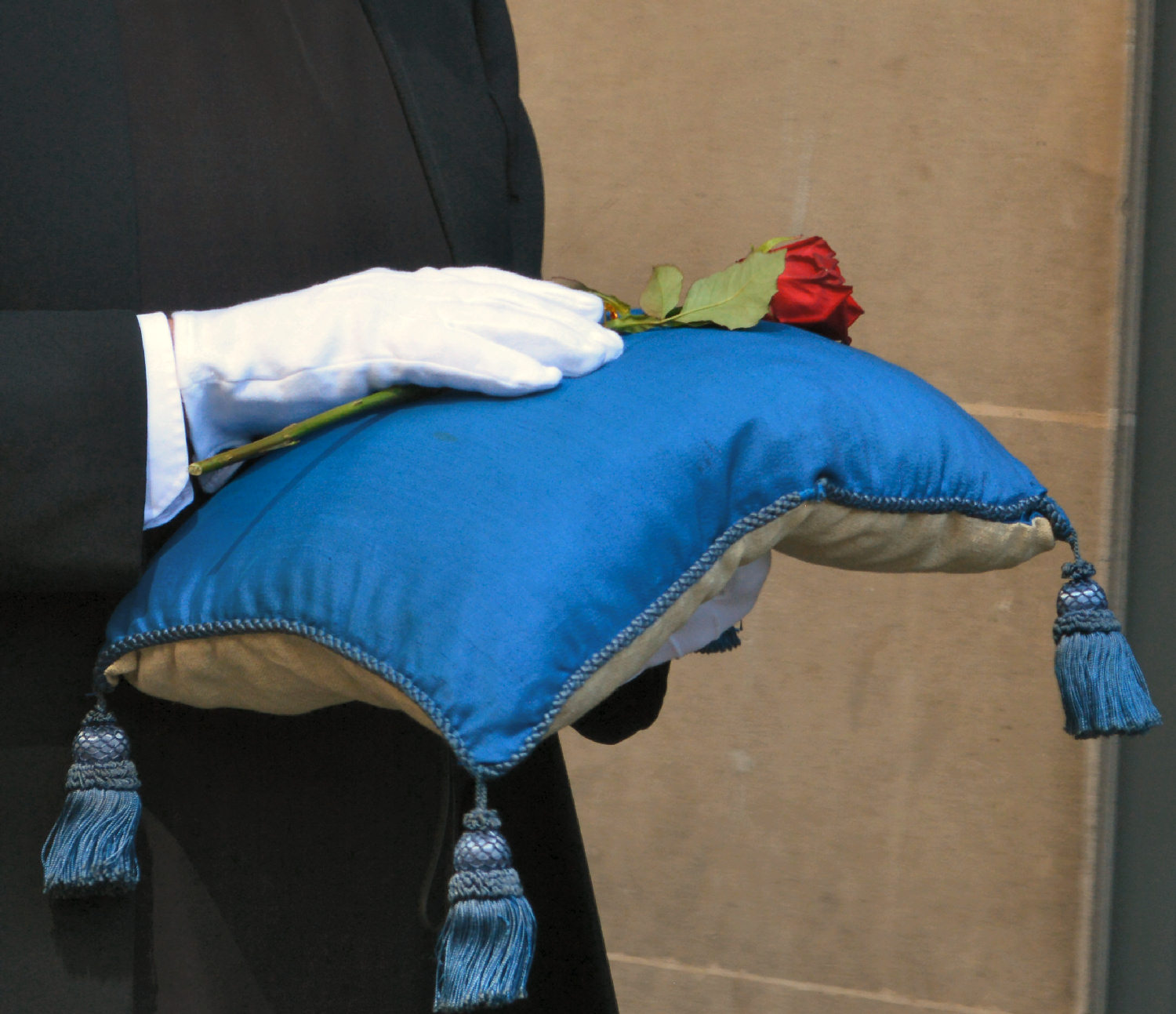
Knollys rose

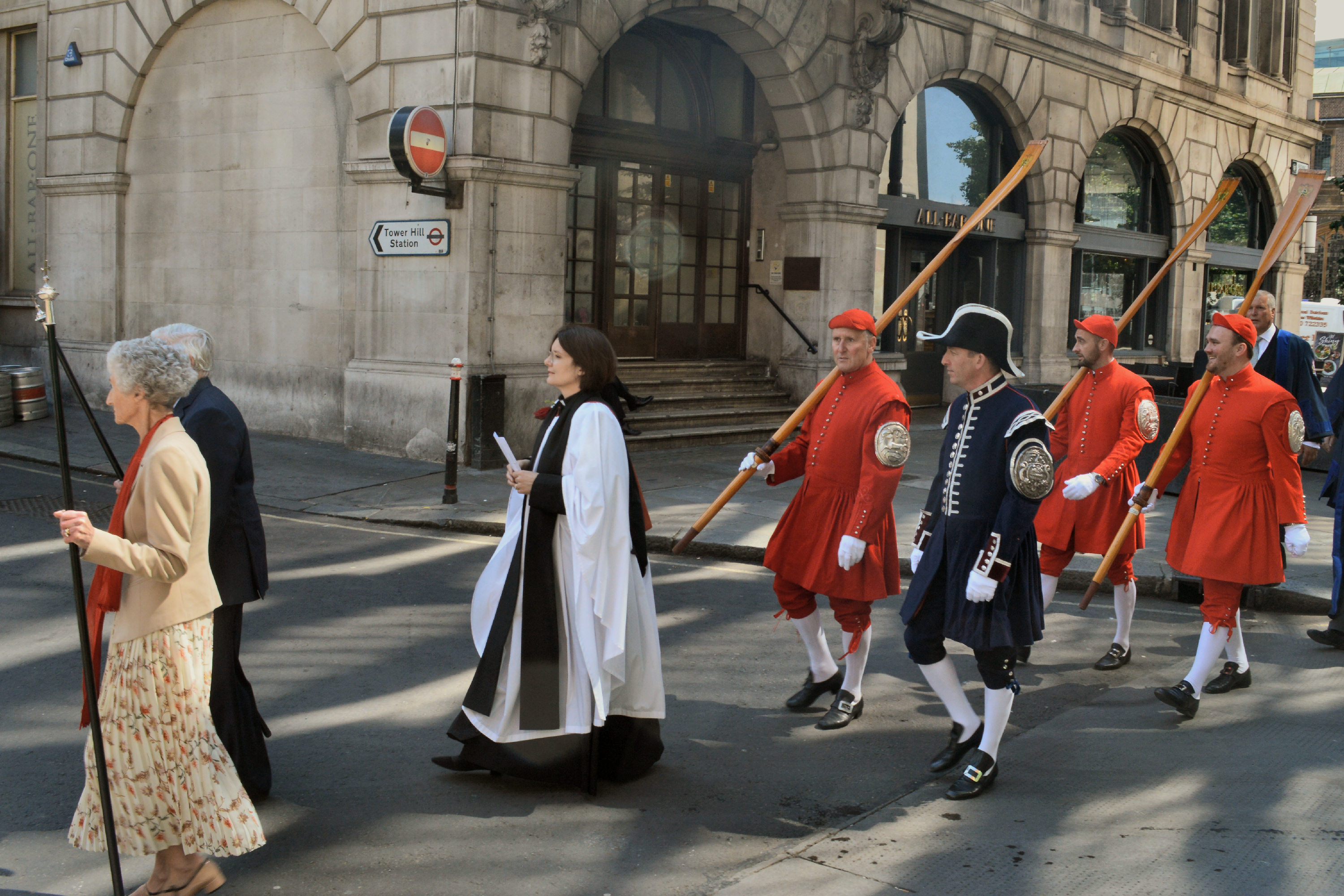
The Knollys Rose procession

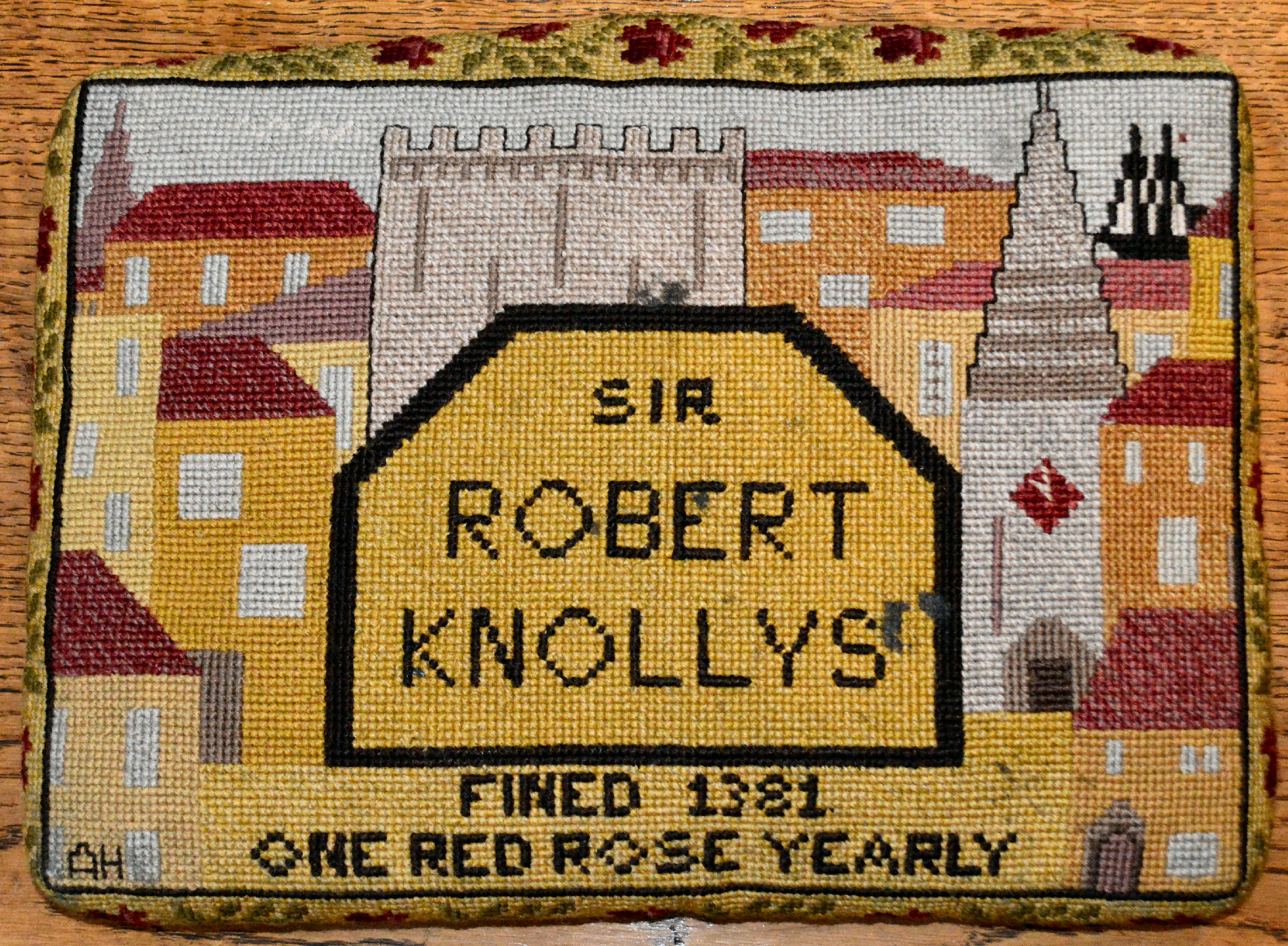
Sir Robert Knollys (prayer) kneeler for ordinary church use

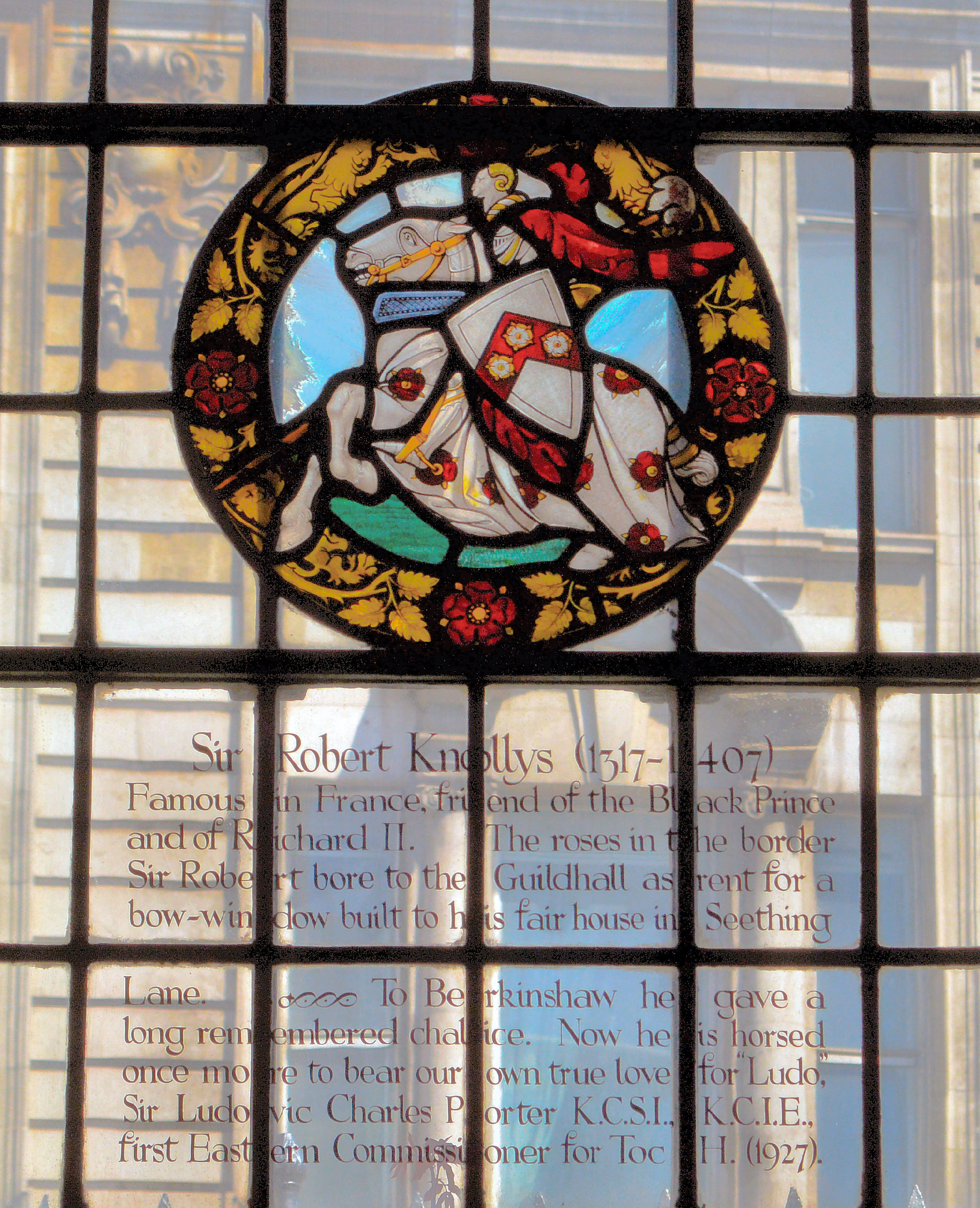
Sir Robert Knollys stained glass window
