= Company of Watermen and Lightermen =

Guild of the City of London

Coordinates: 51.509°N 0.084°W

The Company of Watermen and Lightermen
- Coat of arms of the Company of Watermen and Lightermen
- Motto: "At the commandment of our superiors"
- Location: Watermen’s Hall, 16 St-Mary-at-Hill, London, United Kingdom
- Date of formation: 1514
- Company association: Guild of the City of London
- Master of company: Sean Collins
- Website: https://watermenscompany.com/

The Company of Watermen and Lightermen (CWL) is a historic City guild in the City of London. However, unlike the city's 114 livery companies, CWL does not have a grant of livery. Its meeting rooms are at Waterman's Hall on St Mary at Hill, London.

The role of watermen was to transfer passengers, while lightermen moved goods and cargo, between the Port of London and vessels moored in the River Thames. Although modern river workers are licensed by the Maritime and Coastguard Agency, the company continues its roles arranging apprenticeships, lobbying on river matters, and organising historic annual events and ceremonies.

The company's clerk is Julie Lithgow, formerly director of the Institute of Chartered Shipbrokers.

== History ==
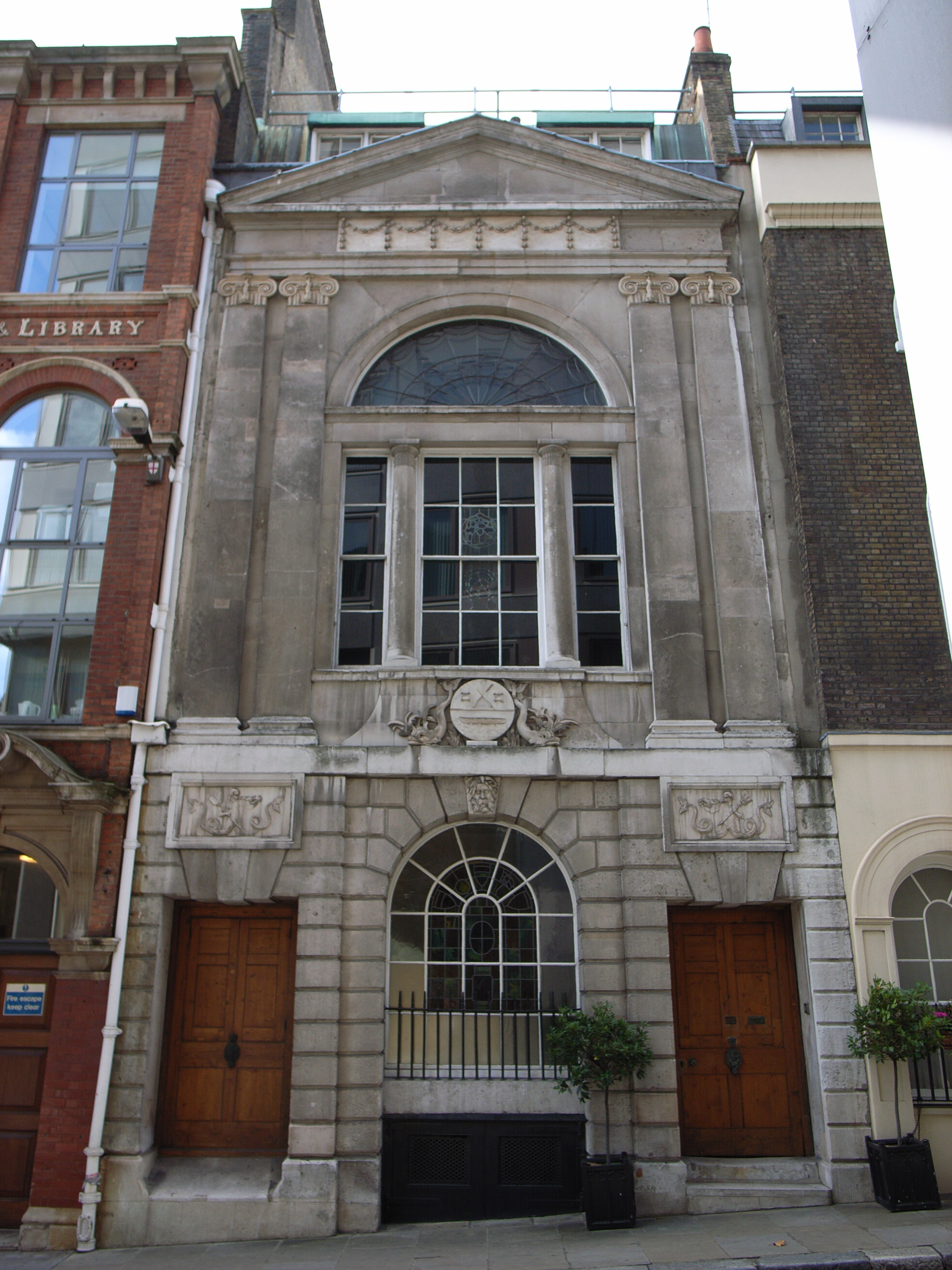
Watermen's Hall, London EC3

Thames Watermen Act 1514
- Act of Parliament
- Parliament of England
- Long title: Acte concernyng Watermen on the Teamys.
- Citation: 6 Hen. 8. c. 7
- Territorial extent: England and Wales

Dates
- Royal assent: 31 March 1515
- Commencement: 5 February 1515 (Note: Start of session.)
- Repealed: 1 August 1827
Other legislation
| Repealed by | Thames Watermen and Lightermen Act 1827 |
| Relates to | Thames Watermen Act 1555; Thames Watermen Act 1604; Thames Watermen Act 1705; Thames Watermen Act 1736 |

Status: Repealed

Text of statute as originally enacted

Thames Watermen Act 1555
- Act of Parliament
- Parliament of England
- Long title: An Act touching Watermen upon the River of Thames.
- Citation: 2 & 3 Ph. & M. c. 16
- Territorial extent: England and Wales

Dates
- Royal assent: 9 December 1555
- Commencement: 24 May 1556 (Note: Section 2. The Feast of Pentecost next.)
- Repealed: 1 August 1827
Other legislation
| Repealed by | Thames Watermen and Lightermen Act 1827 |
| Relates to | Thames Watermen Act 1514; Thames Watermen Act 1604; Thames Watermen Act 1705; Thames Watermen Act 1736 |

Status: Repealed

Text of statute as originally enacted

Thames Watermen Act 1604
- Act of Parliament
- Parliament of England
- Long title: An Acte concerninge Wherrymen and Watermen.
- Citation: 1 Jas. 1. c. 16 (Note: This is the citation in The Statutes of the Realm.); 2 Jas. 1. c. 16 (Note: This is the citation in The Statutes at Large.)
- Territorial extent: England and Wales

Dates
- Royal assent: 7 July 1604
- Commencement: 19 March 1604
- Repealed: 1 August 1827
Other legislation
| Amended by | Thames Watermen Act 1705 |
| Repealed by | Thames Watermen and Lightermen Act 1827 |
| Relates to | Thames Watermen Act 1514; Thames Watermen Act 1555; Thames Watermen Act 1705; Thames Watermen Act 1736 |

Status: Repealed

Text of statute as originally enacted

Thames Watermen Act 1705
- Act of Parliament
- Parliament of England
- Long title: An Act for the better ordering and governing the Watermen and Lightermen upon the River of Thames.
- Citation: 4 & 5 Ann. c. 24; 4 Ann. c. 13
- Territorial extent: England and Wales

Dates
- Royal assent: 19 March 1706
- Commencement: 25 October 1705
- Repealed: 1 August 1827
Other legislation
| Amends | Thames Watermen Act 1604 |
| Repealed by | Thames Watermen and Lightermen Act 1827 |
| Relates to | Thames Watermen Act 1514; Thames Watermen Act 1555; Thames Watermen Act 1604; Thames Watermen Act 1736 |

Status: Repealed

Text of statute as originally enacted

Thames Watermen Act 1736
- Act of Parliament
- Parliament of Great Britain
- Long title: An Act for regulating the Company of Watermen, Wherrymen, and Lightermen, rowing on the River Thames, between Gravesend, in the County of Kent, and Windsor, in the County of Berks.
- Citation: 10 Geo. 2. c. 31
- Territorial extent: Great Britain

Dates
- Royal assent: 21 June 1737
- Commencement: 24 June 1737 (Note: Section 1)
- Repealed: 1 August 1827
Other legislation
| Repealed by | Thames Watermen and Lightermen Act 1827 |
| Relates to | Thames Watermen Act 1514; Thames Watermen Act 1555; Thames Watermen Act 1604 |

Status: Repealed

Text of statute as originally enacted

Thames Watermen and Lightermen Act 1827
- Act of Parliament
- Parliament of the United Kingdom
- Long title: An Act for the better Regulation of the Watermen and Lightermen on the River Thames, between Yantlet Creek and Windsor.
- Citation: 7 & 8 Geo. 4. c. lxxv
- Territorial extent: United Kingdom

Dates
- Royal assent: 14 June 1827
- Commencement: 1 August 1827 (Note: Section 1.)
Other legislation
| Repeals/revokes | Thames Watermen Act 1555; Thames Watermen Act 1604; Thames Watermen Act 1698; Thames Watermen Act 1705; Thames Watermen Act 1736 |
| Repealed by | Watermen's and Lightermen's Amendment Act 1859 |

Status: Repealed

Text of statute as originally enacted

Watermen's and Lightermen's Amendment Act 1859
- Act of Parliament
- Parliament of the United Kingdom
- Long title: An Act for the better Regulation of Watermen, Barge Owners, and others connected with the Navigation of the River Thames between Teddington Lock and Lower Hope Point.
- Citation: 22 & 23 Vict. c. cxxxiii
- Territorial extent: United Kingdom

Dates
- Royal assent: 13 August 1859
- Commencement: 13 August 1859 (Note: The Acts of Parliament (Commencement) Act 1793.)
Other legislation
| Amended by | Thames Watermen's and Lightermen's Act 1893; Port of London Act 1908; Port of London (Consolidation) Act 1920 |

Status: Amended

CWL was established in the medieval period to support and maintain rights of the river workers. The two main occupations were that of watermen and lightermen. The watermen transferred passengers across and along city centre rivers and estuaries. Most notable are those on the Thames and Medway. Other rivers such as the Tyne and Dee in Wales had watermen who formed guilds in medieval times. Lightermen transfer goods between ships and quays (including wharves, jetties and piers) – they specifically loaded (originally 'laded') and unloaded ('alighted') the ships. Laded survives in the phrases bill of lading and fully laden) In the Port of London they overwhelmingly used flat-bottomed barges, called lighters.

The King's Bargemaster and Royal Watermen are chosen from their number.

The company's centuries-spanning apprenticeship index is a popular genealogy source.

=== Annual race ===
The Doggett's Coat and Badge, which was first raced in 1715, is the oldest continuously-run river race. It claims to be the oldest continually staged annual sports event; though single sculls replaced the original skiffs or lighters.

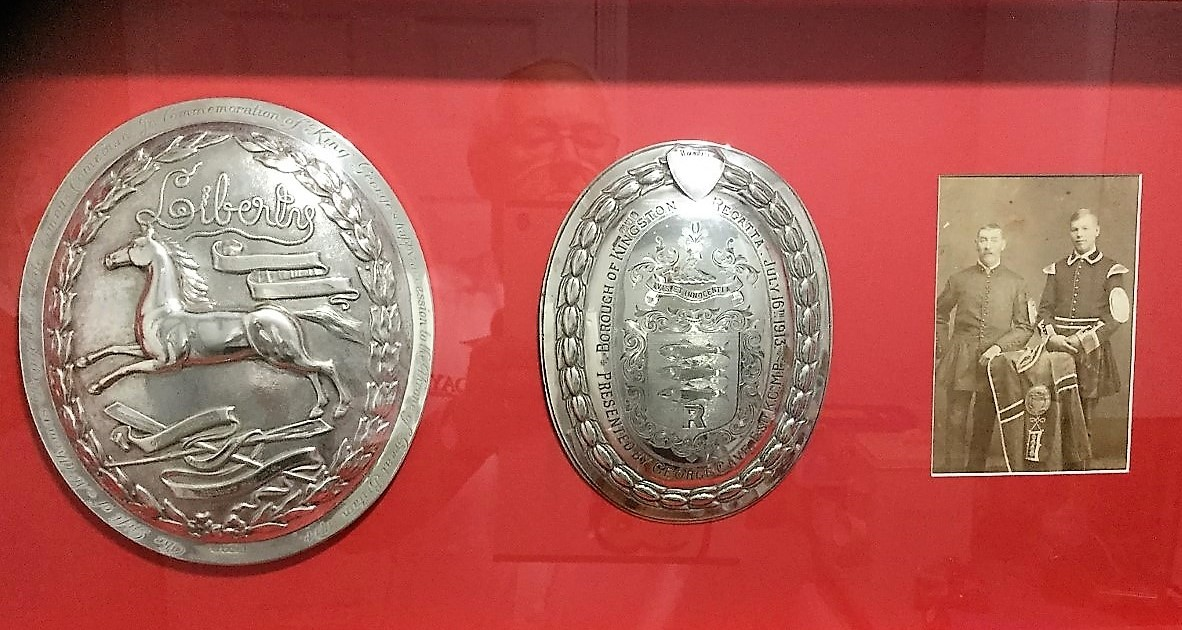
FW Pearces Doggets Badge

The winner's prize is a watermen's red coat plus a silver badge, displaying the White Horse of Hanover and the word "Liberty", in honour of George I's coronation. Each completing contestant of the six apprentice competitors receive a miniature of a Doggett's Badge for their lapel in a ceremony at Watermen's Hall, in silver for the winner and in bronze for the others. The Fishmongers' Company sponsors the awards, rewarding the rowing clubs of the top four with tiered prizes of £1,000, £600, £400, and £200.

Three public houses retain memorabilia of the race :

- Doggett's Coat & Badge, south-side of Blackfriars Bridge close to The Shard, London SE1.
- The Coat & Badge, Putney, London SW15.
- The Doggett Coat and Badge, Margate, lower reaches of the Thames Estuary.

=== Swan Upping ===
Swan Upping is the practice by which the swans found on the river Thames between Sunbury and Abingdon are caught, ringed, and released. The skiffs used for this practice by the King's Marker of the Swans are rowed by a team of oarsmen, from the Watermen and Lightermen.

=== The Tudor Pull ===
Every year the Thames Traditional Rowing Association organise a ceremony called the Tudor Pull, in which the Royal Barge Gloriana is escorted down the Thames by cutters, all crewed by the King's Barge Master and members of the Watermen & Lightermen Company. They transport 'The Stela' - a section of ancient wooden water pipe - from Hampton Court Palace to the Tower of London, where it is handed over to the Duty Governor of the Tower and the Yeoman Warders.

=== Mayoral duties ===
Every June, since 1381, the company holds the Knollys Rose Ceremony when a well-dressed procession presents a fresh rose to the incumbent Lord Mayor of London at his official residence, the Mansion House. CWL also takes part in the annual Lord Mayor's Show.

== Modern roles ==
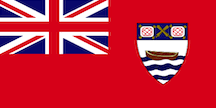
Company of Watermen and Lightermen Ensign

CWL lobbies on river-related matters. It often works alongside the Passenger Boat Association, raising issues about jobs, legislation, and safety. The organisation negotiates with the UK government and its agencies. For example, in 2003 the Company of Watermen and Lightermen was given funding to provide assistance grants to apprentices from the riverside east London boroughs of Tower Hamlets and Newham.

== Charitable work ==
In 1975 a linked charity, Transport on Water (TOW), was founded by members and people in public life. It aims to maintain the Thames and other waterways, including the Medway, as working rivers. It has organised The Thames Barge Driving Race since 1975.

== Arms ==
Coat of arms of Company of Watermen and Lightermen
| Adopted 18 September 1585 Crest On a wreath Argent and Gules a dexter arm embowed vested Argent holding in the hand proper an oar erect Or Torse A wreath argent and gules Escutcheon Argent, in base barry wavy of six Azure and Argent a boat proper, on a chief Azure two oars in saltire Or between two cushions Argent fretted Gules trimmed Argent tasselled Or Supporters On either side a dolphin haurient Argent finned, eyed and tusked Or Motto At commandment of our superiors (Note: The standard spelling is listed on the Company's website. The spelling used in this emblazonment mirrors the spelling used in the logo of the Company as found their website.) |

== See also ==
- Maritime transport
- Knollys Rose Ceremony
- Free Watermen and Lightermen's Almshouses
