= Free Watermen and Lightermen's Almshouses =

Free Watermen and Lightermen's Almshouses / Royal Watermen's Almshouses
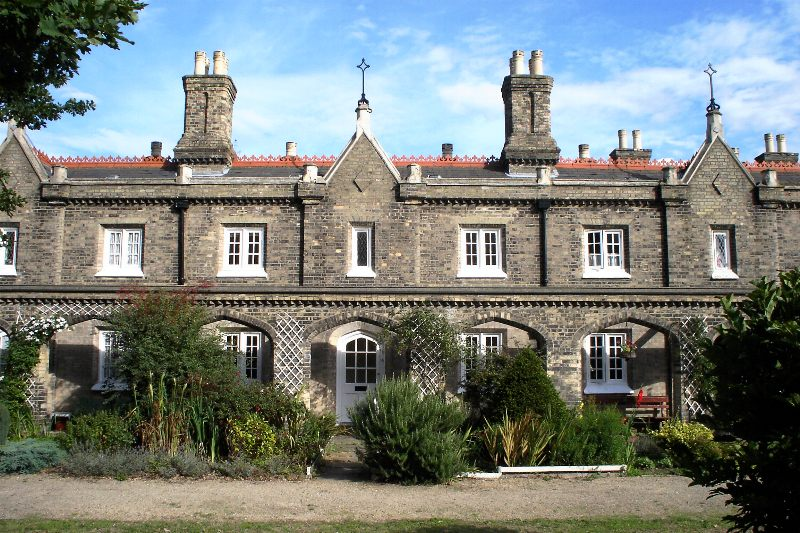
- Interactive map of the Free Watermen and Lightermen's Almshouses / Royal Watermen's Almshouses area

General information
- Architectural style: Victorian architecture, Tudor Revival architecture
- Location: Penge, London Borough of Bromley, England
- Coordinates: 51.4166°N 0.0538°W
- Construction started: 1840
- Completed: 1841
- Client: Company of Watermen and Lightermen, City of London

Technical details
- Structural system: Yellow brick with limestone dressings

Design and construction
- Architect: George Porter

Listed Building – Grade II
- Designated: 1973
- Reference no.: 1040012

The Free Watermen and Lightermen's Almshouses (generally known as the Royal Watermen's Almshouses) on Beckenham Road / Penge High Street, Penge, London Borough of Bromley were built in 1840–1841 to designs by the architect George Porter by the Company of Watermen and Lightermen of the City of London for retired company freemen and their widows. It is the most prominent and oldest of the Victorian almshouses in Penge. In 1973, the almspeople were moved to a new site in Hastings, and the original buildings were converted into private homes. They have been Grade II listed since 1973.
