= Doggett's Coat and Badge =

Rowing race

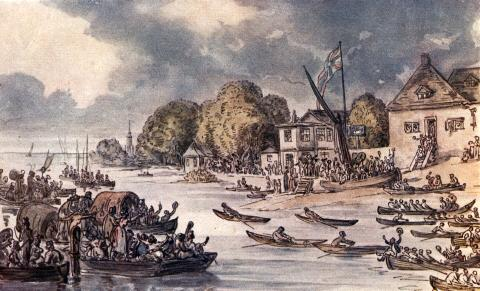
The finish of Doggett's Coat and Badge. Painting by Thomas Rowlandson (1756–1827).

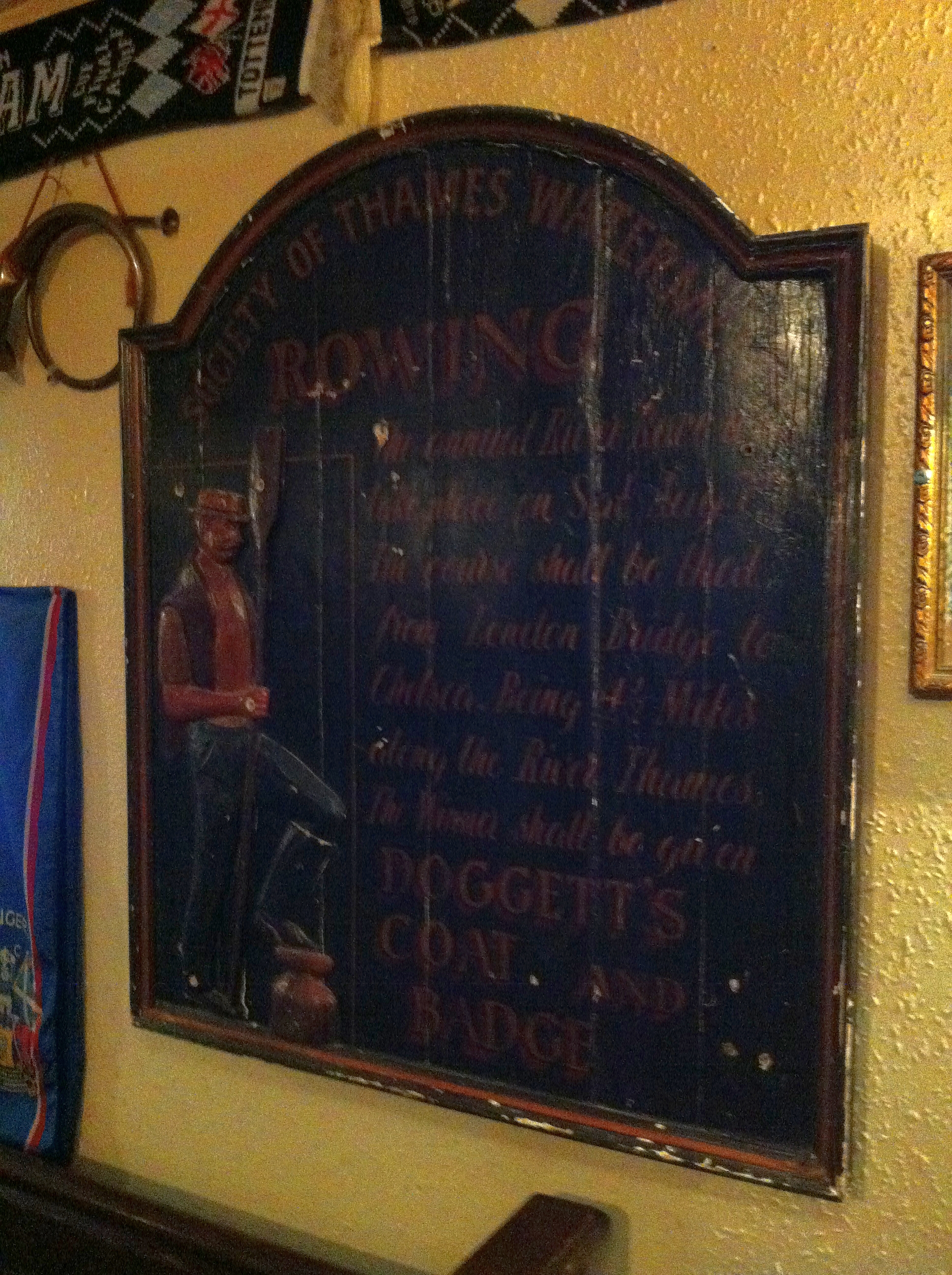
Announcement of the annual race for Doggett's Coat and Badge.

Doggett's Coat and Badge is the prize and name for the oldest continuous rowing race in the world. Up to six apprentice watermen of the River Thames in England compete for this prestigious honour, which has been held every year since 1715. The 4 mile 5 furlongs (7.44 km) race is rowed on the River Thames upstream from London Bridge to Cadogan Pier, Chelsea, passing under a total of eleven bridges. Originally, it was raced every 1 August against the outgoing (falling or ebb) tide, in the boats used by watermen to ferry passengers across the Thames. Today it is raced at a time amenable to spectators, in September, that coincides with the incoming (rising or flood) tide, in contemporary single sculling boats.

The winner's prize is a traditional watermen's red coat with a silver badge added, displaying the horse of the House of Hanover and the word "Liberty", in honour of the accession of George I to the throne. In addition, each competitor who completes the course receives a miniature of a Doggett's Badge for their lapel in a ceremony at Watermen's Hall, in silver for the winner and in bronze for the others. Monetary prizes are also awarded by the Fishmongers' Company to the rowing clubs of those taking part, with £1,000 to the winner's club, £600 for second, £400 for third and £200 for fourth.

In addition to the prizes received, winning Doggett's Coat and Badge in the 18th and 19th centuries would help attract more trade to the talented waterman. While this is no longer the case, winning the Doggett's Coat and Badge is today still seen as very prestigious.

== History ==
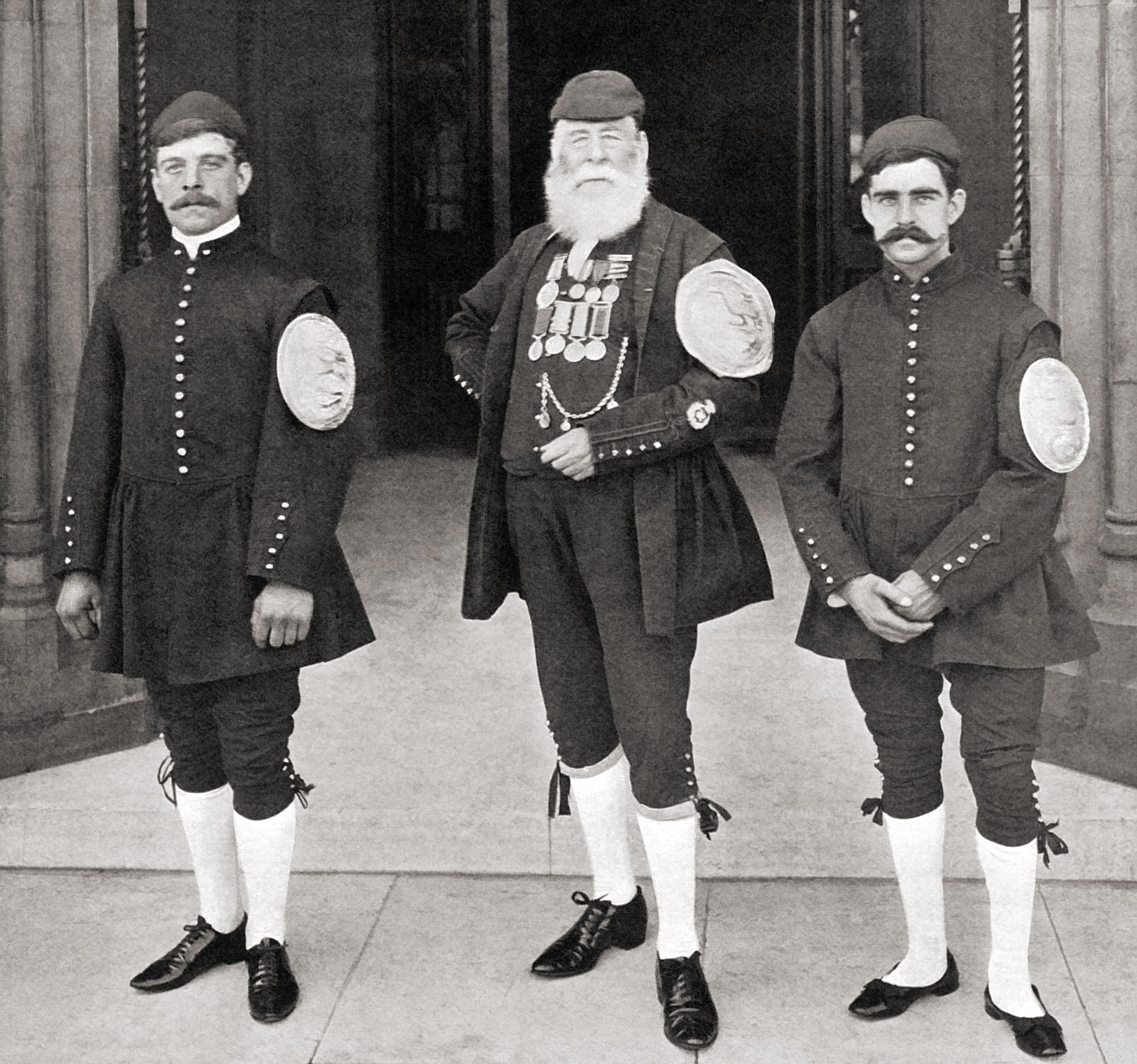
Three winners of the race. Pictured, left to right, are: J. J. Turferry (winner in 1900), W. H. Campbell (1850), A. H. Brewer (1901)

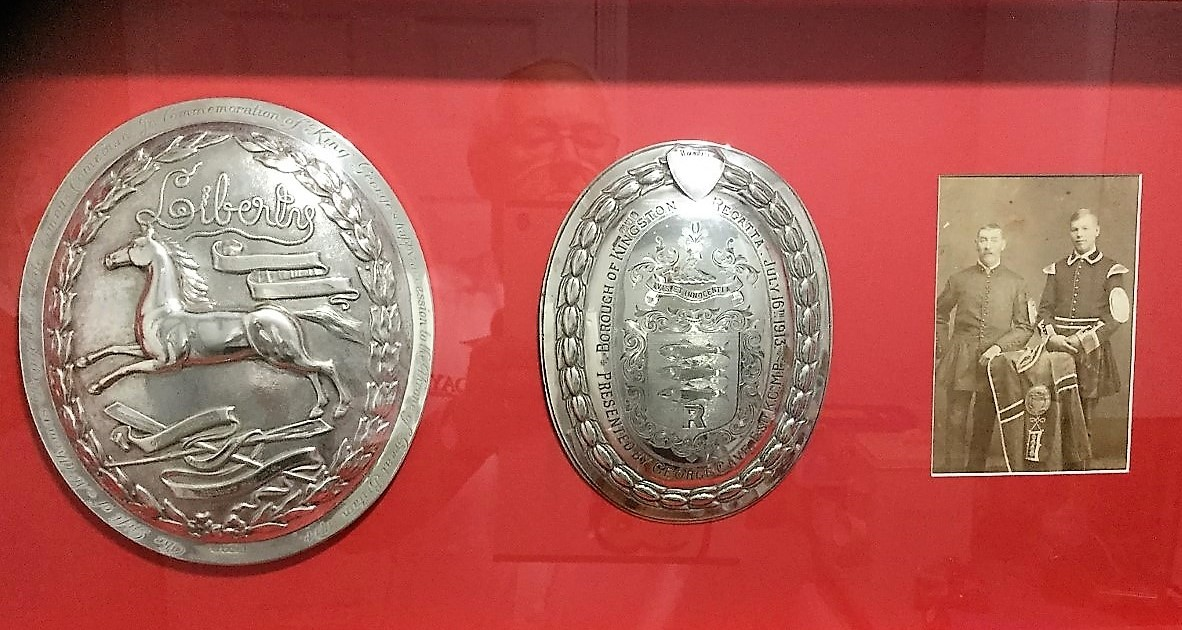
Frederick William Pearce's badge from winning the 1916 Doggett's race pictured alongside his father and previous winner from 1894, both wearing the Doggett's coats

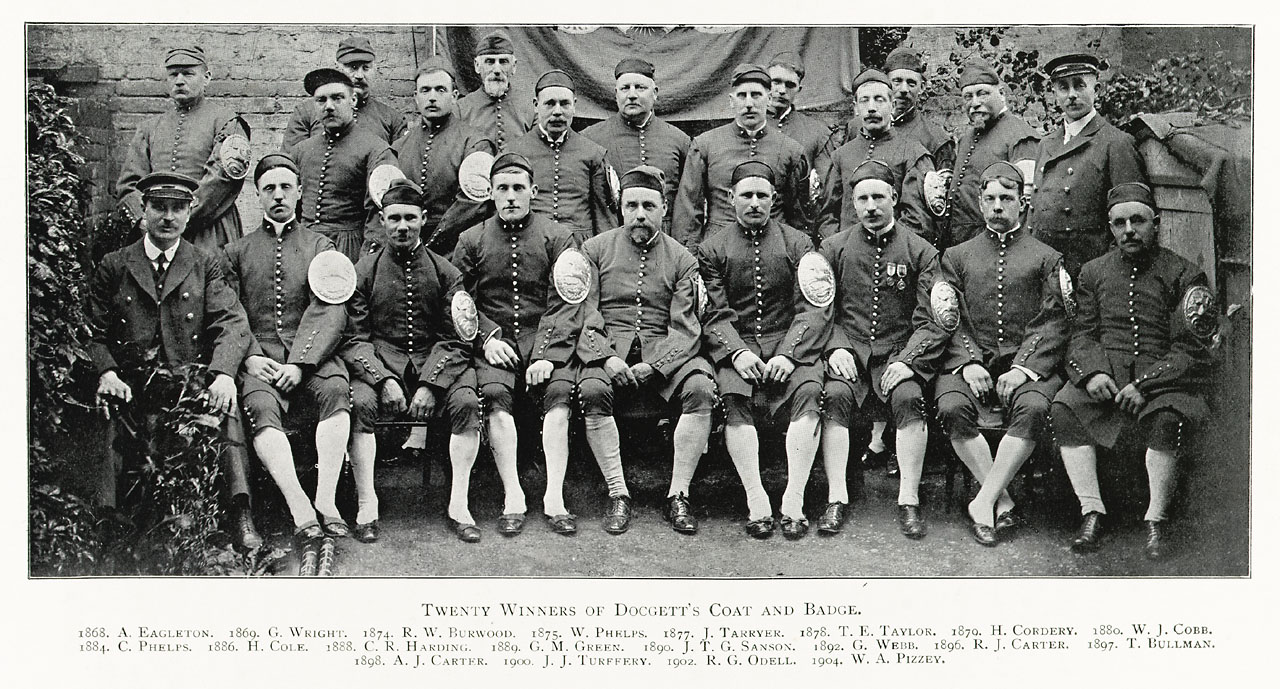
Twenty winners pictured in 1908

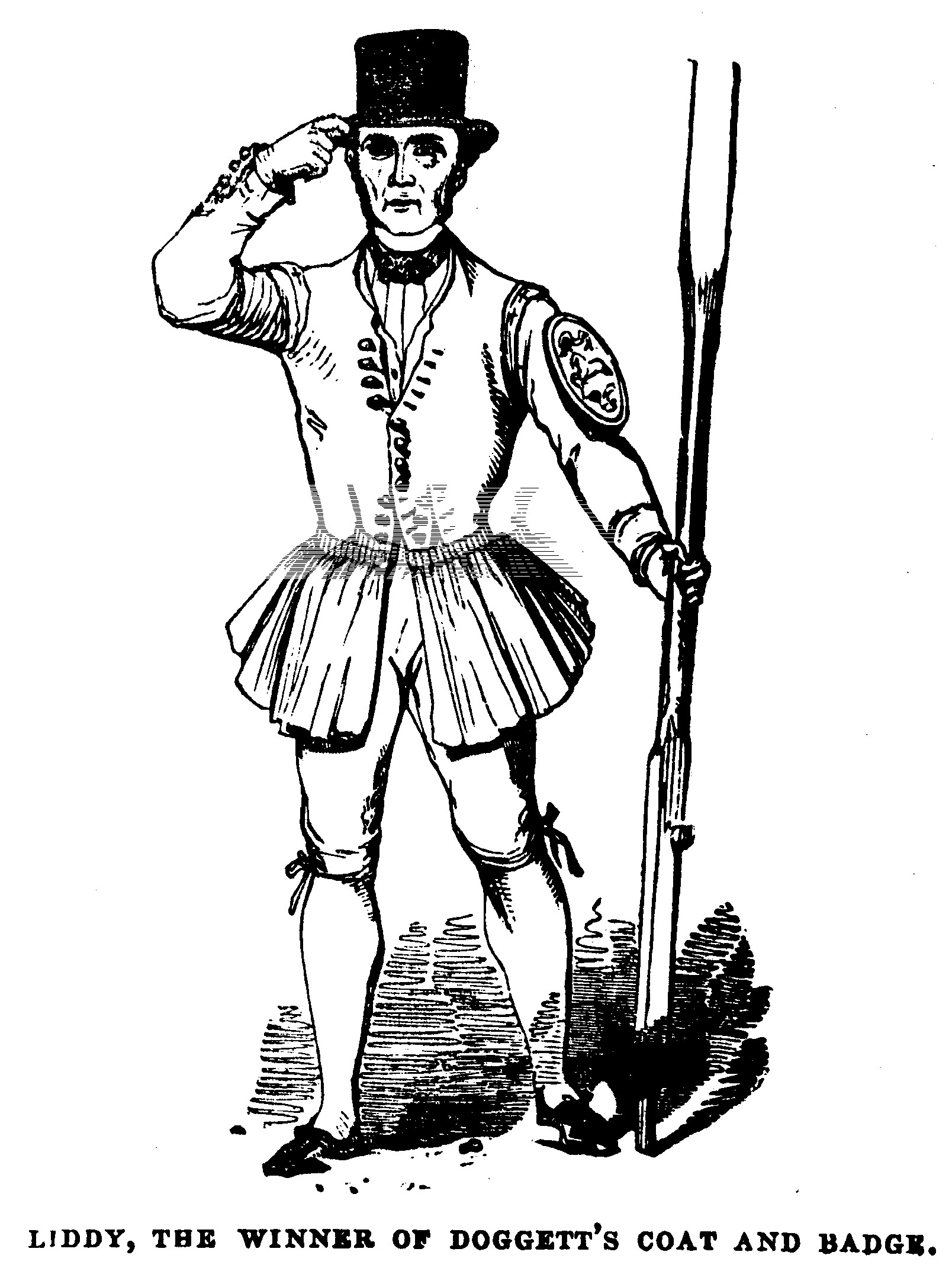
"Liddy, the Winner of Doggett's Coat and Badge" Illustrated London News, 6 August 1842

Thomas Doggett was an Irish actor and comedian who became joint manager of Drury Lane Theatre. He relied heavily upon the watermen of the Thames, who were then the equivalent of the modern taxi driver, to convey him between the various plying stairs near his workplaces in the City of London and his residence in Chelsea. There is a legend that in 1715 Doggett was rescued by a waterman after falling overboard whilst crossing the Thames near Embankment. Although this has always been dismissed, along with other myths, by the Fishmongers' Company, the story continues that in gratitude for his rescue he offered a rowing wager to the fastest of six young watermen in their first year of freedom, over the course between "The Swan" pub at London Bridge and "The Swan" pub at Chelsea. Rowing wagers were common in those days, but this one was unique: Doggett set the wager to be a traditional red watermen's coat, but, being a "great Whig in Politics", Doggett arranged the race for 1 August each year, and had the coat furnished with a silver badge "representing Liberty", to commemorate the accession to the throne on 1 August 1714 of George I of the House of Hanover. The current badge prominently features both the word "Liberty" and an image of the horse, an emblem of the House of Hanover.

The race was organised and financed by Doggett each year from 1715 until his death in 1721. In his will, Doggett left specific instructions for the continuation of the race, which is now held by the Fishmongers' Company, a livery company of the City of London. However, over the ages, several particulars have changed:

- Originally, the race was run against the tide, but since 1873 it has been run with the incoming tide.
- It was intended to be held each "1st day of August forever", but now often occurs in September, with the precise date and time depending on the tides.
- The intention was that competitors should race in the boats of their passenger-ferrying trade. At first these boats were four-seater passenger wherries (which could take nearly two hours to row the distance), later "old fashion boats", then "best" boats, then clinker gigs, then modified best boats. Since 1769 the Fishmongers' Company has set regulations; these state that all vessels must be "common Scullers Boats" and examined by the Company. Contemporary single sculls are now used and take about 30 minutes to race the course.
- Lots were originally drawn at Watermen's Hall but are now drawn at Fishmongers' Hall due to unfair practices.
- As the population of watermen has declined, since 1988 the event has been open to unsuccessful competitors to row again in their second and third years of freedom.

== Timeline ==
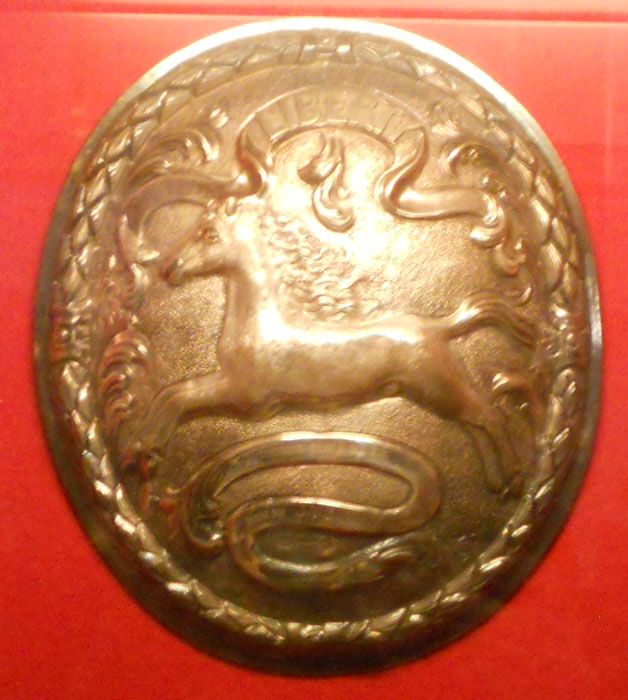
Badge won by J T Sanson of Kew, in 1890

- 1 August 1714 – Accession to the throne of George I of the House of Hanover
- 1715 – There is a myth that Doggett fell into the Thames, and was saved by watermen
- 1 August 1715 – the first Doggett's Coat and Badge race
- 1721 – Doggett dies; his will leaves specific instructions for race to continue
- 1722 – Race renamed from "The Brunswick Competition" to "Doggett's Coat and Badge". It is won in 1722 by William Morris, thus he was technically the first winner of the Doggett's Coat and Badge.
- 1730 – Race won by Jack Broughton, a champion pugilist
- 1769 – Fishmongers' Company established strict regulations to ensure fair competition
- 1819 - Race won by William Emery (1798–1867), later freeman of Feltmakers Guild and then Beadle of St Martins Church
- 1873 – Race rowed with the incoming tide from this year onward
- 1880 – Race won by William J. Cobb who was so proud of his victory he became known as 'Doggett Cobb'
- 1887 – Race won by William Giles East who went on to win the Sculling Championship of England in 1891, became a Queen's Waterman in 1898, and Barge Master to the King in 1906.
- 1894 – Race won by Frederick Pearce of Hammersmith, in 32 minutes, 22 seconds. According to the original conditions the men should have rowed against the tide but the flood was still running when Frederick passed the winning post. 'Sons of the Thames' Pearce came from a long line of watermen and lighterman.
- 1916 – Race won by Frederick William Pearce of Hammersmith. (His father previously won it in 1894.) Due to the First World War all races were put on hold. The race was next run in 1920.
- 1973 – The fastest race yet, won by Bobby Prentice in 23 minutes 22 seconds.
- 1988 – Race opened to unsuccessful prior competitors to row in their second and third years of freedom.
- 1992 – Claire Burran was the first woman to compete. Sister of 1988 winner Glen Hayes, she came third in rough conditions.
- 2005 – The 291st race was the closest in recent memory: it was won by only a few lengths, and there was a dead heat for second and third places.

== Related information ==
The race has also given its name to two pubs: "Doggett's Coat & Badge" on the southern end of Blackfriars Bridge and "The Coat and Badge", Lacy Road, Putney. There was a pub in Margate named "The Doggett Coat and Badge"; it closed permanently in 2013 and the building now houses an ice cream shop.

== See also ==
- History of rowing
- Rowing on the River Thames
- House of Hanover
- Company of Watermen and Lightermen
