= Wolf Solent =

1929 novel by John Cowper Powys

- First edition (US)
- Author: John Cowper Powys
- Language: English
- Genre: Bildungsroman
- Publisher: Simon and Schuster, New York
- Publication date: 1929
- Publication place: England
- Preceded by: Ducdame (1925)
- Followed by: A Glastonbury Romance (1932)

Wolf Solent is a novel by John Cowper Powys (1872–1963) that was written while he was based in Patchin Place, New York City, and travelling around the US as a lecturer. It was published by Simon and Schuster in May 1929 in New York. The British edition, published by Jonathan Cape, appeared in July 1929. This, Powys's fourth novel, was his first literary success. It is a bildungsroman in which the eponymous protagonist, a thirty-five-year-old history teacher, returns to his birthplace, where he discovers the inadequacy of his dualistic philosophy. Wolf resembles John Cowper Powys in that an elemental philosophy is at the centre of his life, and because, like Powys, he hates science and modern inventions like cars and planes, and is attracted to slender, androgynous women. Wolf Solent is the first of Powys's four Wessex novels. Powys both wrote about the same region as Thomas Hardy and was a twentieth-century successor to the great nineteenth-century novelist.

The novel is set in the fictional towns of Ramsgard, Dorset (based on Sherborne, Dorset, where Powys attended school from May 1883); Blacksod (modelled on Yeovil, Somerset); and Kings Barton, modelled on Bradford Abbas, Dorset. It has references to other places in Dorset, including Dorchester and Weymouth, that were also full of memories for Powys.

== Background ==
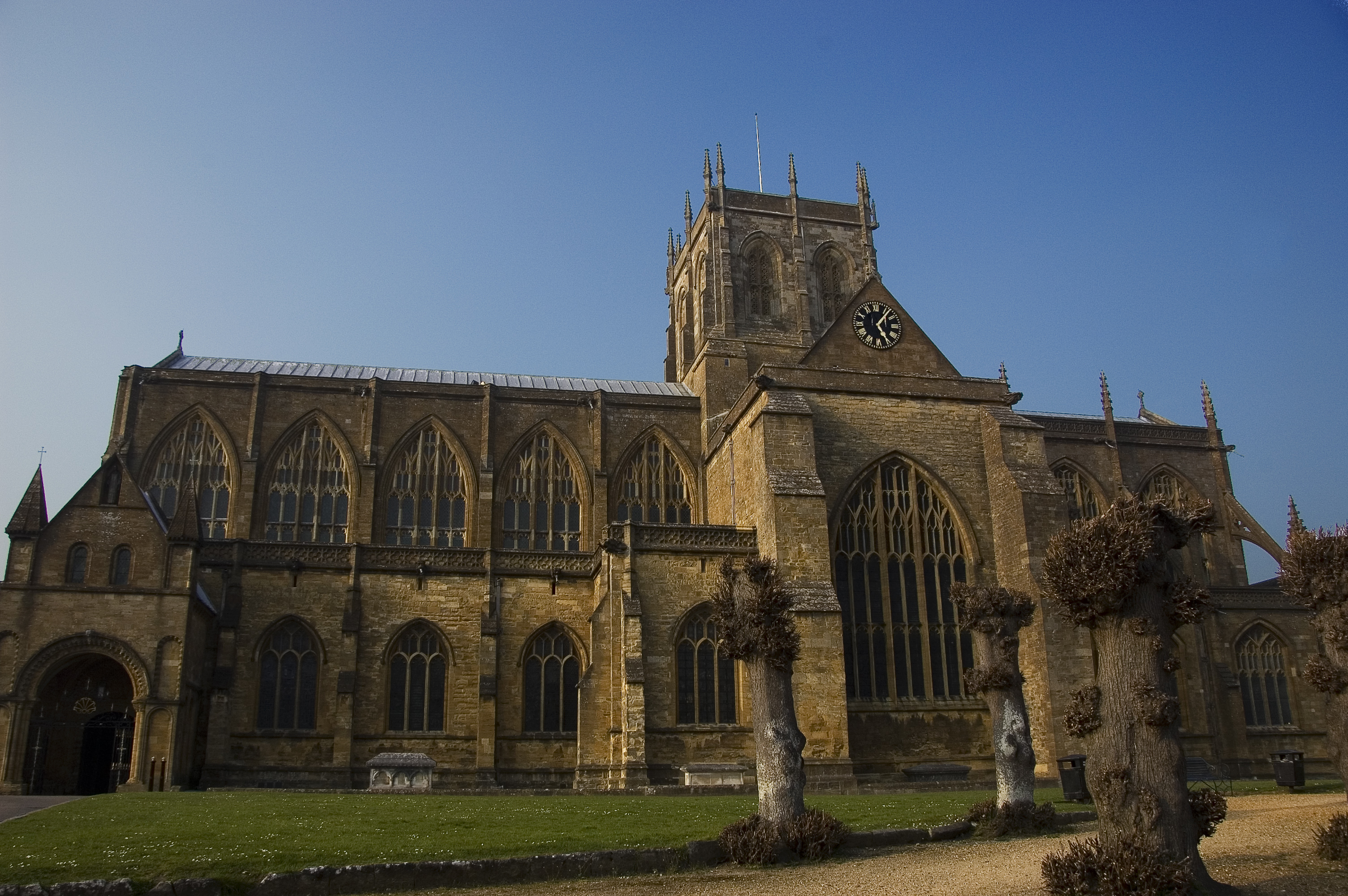
Sherborne Abbey, Sherborne, Dorset. "As I wrote Wolf Solent travelling through […] the United States […] I became more and more intensely aware […] of the country round Sherborne; with the Abbey and the Preparatory School and the Big School".

Wolf Solent was Powys's first successful novel. There were six impressions of the first edition (American) between 1929 and 1930 and three of the British edition in 1929. There were translations into German (1930, French (1931), and several other European languages. However, Powys had to cut 318 pages from his typescript before Wolf Solent was published by Simon and Schuster. These pages (amounting to six chapters) were hastily condensed into a revised chapter 19 ‘Wine’ for its first publication. They were eventually published with editorial commentary in July 2021, but no attempt has been made as yet to incorporate them into an updated complete Wolf Solent. Some variations to the plot — particularly the disfigurement of Gerda, which is only referred to in the deleted chapters — make such an integration problematic. Following the success of Wolf Solent three of Powys's works of popular philosophy were also best-sellers: The Meaning of Culture (1929), In Defence of Sensuality (1930), A Philosophy of Solitude (1933).

Prior to this Powys had published three apprentice novels: Wood and Stone (1915), Rodmoor (1916), Ducdame (1925), and had also written After My Fashion in 1920, though it was not published until 1980. He had begun work on Wolf Solent in February 1925, It is "the first of the four Wessex novels which established John Cowper Powys's reputation", an allusion not only to the place but to the influence of Thomas Hardy on him: his first novel, Wood and Stone was dedicated to Hardy.

In the Preface he wrote for the 1961 Macdonald edition of the novel Powys states: "Wolf Solent is a book of Nostalgia, written in a foreign country with the pen of a traveller and the ink-blood of his home. Wolf Solent is set in Ramsgard, based on Sherborne, Dorset, where Powys attended school from May 1883, as well as Blacksod, modelled on Yeovil, Somerset, and Dorchester, Dorset and Weymouth, Dorset, both in Dorset, all places full of memories for him.

While Powys had been born in Shirley, Derbyshire and lived there for this first seven years of his life, his father then returned to his home county of Dorset, and, after a brief stay in Weymouth, the family resided in Dorchester from May 1880 until the Christmas of 1885. Powys's paternal grandmother lived in nearby Weymouth. For the rest of his youth Powys lived in Montacute, just over the Dorset border in Somerset. Also in the 1961 Preface Powys records the fact that he and his brother Littleton would often "scamper home" on a Sunday from school in Sherborne via Yeovil: "Sherborne was five miles from Montacute; and Yeovil was five miles from Montacute".

The seaside resort of Weymouth is the main setting of his novel Weymouth Sands (1934, published as Jobber Skald in England) while Maiden Castle (1935), which alludes to Thomas Hardy's Mayor of Casterbridge, is set in Dorchester (Hardy's Casterbridge). Powys had first settled in Dorchester, after returning from America in 1934. These two works, along with Wolf Solent and A Glastonbury Romance (1932) make up Powys's four main Wessex novels. A Further indication of the importance of familiar places in Powys's fiction is that Glastonbury is just a few miles north of Montacute.

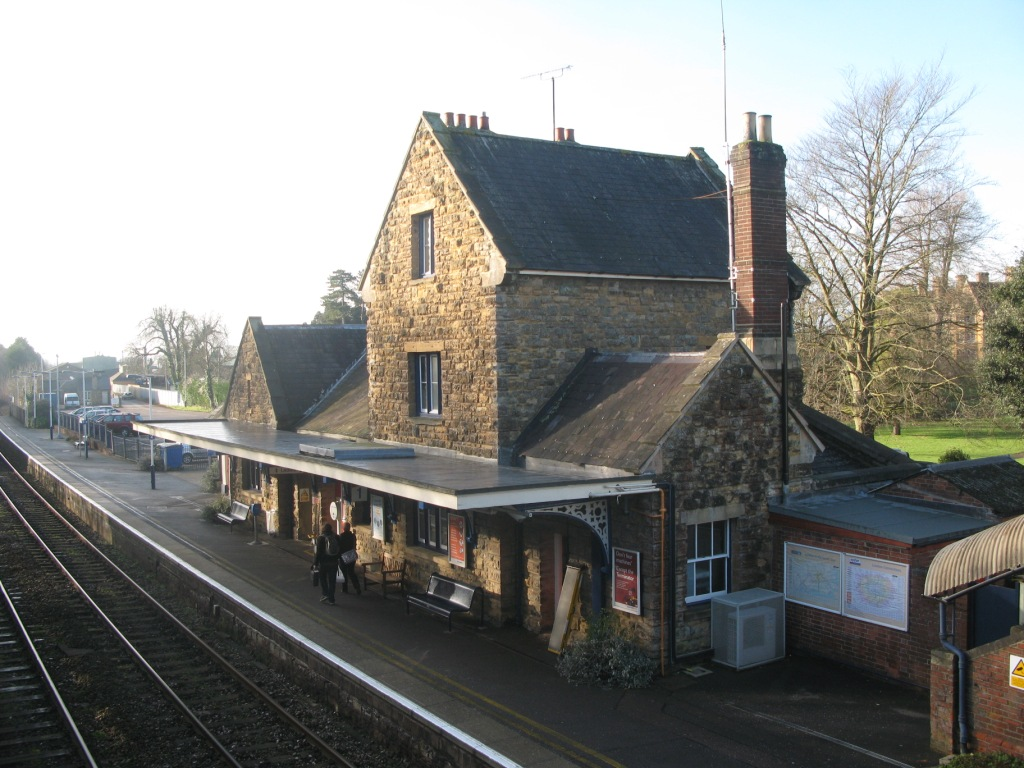
Sherborne station 2009. The novel opens with Wolf Solent travelling to Ramsgard station, based on Sherborne station, from London in 1921.

== Plot summary ==
The novel begins with its eponymous, thirty-five-year-old hero on a train returning to his native Dorset to Ramsgard (Sherborne). This follows the loss of his job as a history teacher in London, following an outburst in class in which “he found himself pouring forth a torrent of wild, indecent invective upon every aspect of modern civilization”. This nervous collapse had been triggered by a look of “inert despair” that he had seen on the face of a man on the steps of Waterloo station in London. He is journeying back to his childhood hometown because he has been hired as a “literary assistant” by the squire of nearby King’s Barton. Wolf in “escaping from an insensitive, brutal world and trivial world” of London, is moving to a place “where he will have a greater freedom to know and be himself”.

This is also a homecoming for him, as he left Ramsgard with his mother when he was ten and it is the place where his father died. In Ramsgard he feels “free of his mother” with whom he has always lived and whom he left in London and “Bound up in some strange affiliation with that skeleton [his father] in the [Ramsgard] cemetery”. In due course Wolf discovers that his father had sunk from being a respected history teacher and had died in the Ramsgard workhouse “in obscure circumstances after some ‘depravity’”, which involved the pornographic bookseller Malakite, Wolf also finds out that his father had had several affairs, and that he has a half-sister, and that Malakite had an incestuous relationship with his elder daughter.

Peter Easingwood suggests, that “[u]nderlying ‘’Wolf Solent’’ is a sensuous-mystical feeling for the natural world that goes with an attempted rejection of human society”. However, Wolf cannot escape human involvement. He has to work, and this involves him in a moral dilemma, because he comes to believe that Squire Urquhart is “the embodiment of evil” and his planned book dangerously immoral. Furthermore, he cannot escape the influence of his mother. Wolf had assured her that she could join him "when I've got a cottage" but she arrives unexpectedly in Dorset earlier than Wolf had planned. But, more seriously he cannot, through his sensuous pleasure in nature, escape from his body and in particular sex, and Wolf soon becomes involved with two women: "Gerda, the child of nature, whom he marries, and the more intellectual and complex Christie", the younger daughter of Malakite. It therefore appears that Wolf Solent is "designed to show how Solent has chosen Dorset as his best retreat, only to find himself cornered". Or, as another writer suggests: "The landscape and the emotional intimacies of his relationships in Dorset manage to attack [Wolf’s] inner life as no physical or personal contact in London had done".

Wolf Solent is a novel that focuses on the inner psychic tensions in its protagonist's life, central to this is what Wolf calls his "mythology": "Wolf has taken refuge in a mythological world of his own invention; and at the heart of his 'mythology' there is a struggle between good and evil, seen in the black and white terms of conventional morality".

By the end of the novel Wolf realizes that he and his wife Gerda have little in common and "that he has confused love with 'a mixture of lust and romance'", and that he should have married Christie Malakite. However, he had believed "that any closer involvement with Christie […] would destroy his 'mythology" and his stubborn clinging to this idea ruins their relationship.

Wolf at the end faces the loss of his "mythology" and questions how human beings can "go on living, when their live-illusion was destroyed". Suicide seems a possibility, but the novel ends with Wolf having "a kind of vision" involving a field of golden buttercups, and realizing "that traditional morality" the kind his "mythology" operated under "is too simple". "Powys's vision is not tragic but essentially comic-grotesque". The final words of Wolf Solent — "Well, I shall have a cup of tea" — have been described by Peter Easingwood as "notoriously bathetic". According to Robert Timlin however, "Once its significance in the context of the book as a whole is understood, for Powys to end with Wolf planning to have a cup of tea can be regarded as neither an example of bathos nor an arbitrary decision but an entirely appropriate finish. A light touch, yes, but hardly without resonance."

=== Main characters ===
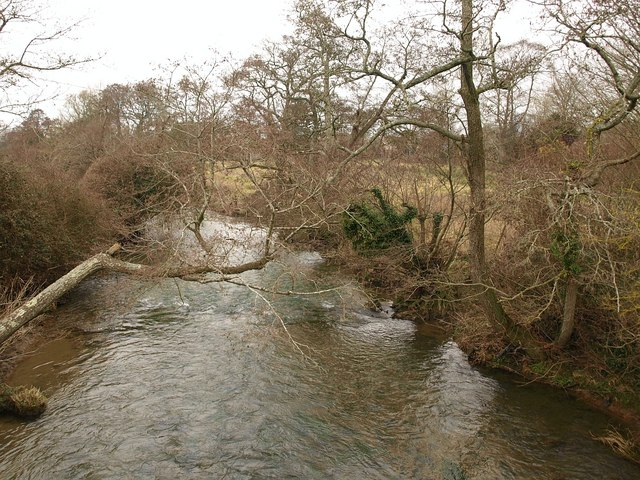
The River Yeo at Bradford Abbas. In a letter in 1925 Powys refers to the setting of Wolf Solent: "It won't really be Bradford Abbas nor will Yeovil be Yeovil or Sherborne Sherborne, but it will be my idea of those places". The River Yeo (Lunt in the novel) runs through all these places.

- Wolf Solent: A thirty-five year old history teacher, who starts a new life near his birthplace, Ramsgard (Sherborne), Dorset. He resembles John Cowper Powys and has been described as "Powys's mouthpiece for most of the time". Wolf is a follower of Powys's elemental philosophy: he hates science and modern inventions, such as cars and planes, and like Powys is attracted to slender, androgynous women.
- Ann Solent: Wolf's mother. She and Wolf have lived in London since Wolf was ten. She eventually follows Wolf to Dorset. Krisdottir suggests that her character is based on that of Powys sister Marian, who followed him to New York, became an expert in lace and started her own business there.
- William Solent: Wolf's father, a former history teacher in Ramsgard, he died in the town's workhouse after some scandal. His wife left him and went to live in London when Wolf was ten.
- Mattie Smith: Wolf's half sister who marries Darnley Otter at the end of the novel and arranges to adopt Olwen.
- Squire John Urquhart of Kings Barton who hires Wolf to help him write his Rabelasian "History of Dorset", a work that concentrates "on scandal and crime. Kings Barton is based on the village of Bradford Abbas between Yeovil and Sherborne.
- Gerda Torp: The eighteen-year-old daughter of Blacksod gravedigger and tombstone maker, who is making Redfern's tombstone for Squire Urquhart. Wolf is attracted by Gerda's beauty and her affinity with the natural world, symbolized by her ability to whistle like a blackbird. He seduces Gerda within a week of meeting her and then marries her. She is both "a kind of earth spirit" and "at the same time an ordinary country girl" It has been suggested that Gerda is based, in part, on Powys' wife Margaret Lyon.
- Christie Malakite: Younger daughter of Malakite. She has read widely and has much more in common with Wolf than Gerda. She also "belongs to the boy-girl type" that Powys himself was deeply attracted to. Morine Krissdottir in Descents of Memory suggests that she is based upon Powys's lover Phyllis Playter, whom he met in March 1921, and eventually lived with for the rest of his life.
- Selena Gault: is an "eccentric ugly woman who is spiritual mother to Wolf", and who had probably been his father's lover.
- Jason Otter: A poet. Cambridge scholar Glen Cavaliero suggests that "Wolf's interior dialogue with the man on the Waterloo steps is paralleled by his actual dialogue with Jason", who "acts as a kind of malevolent chorus". The novel has "three haunting poems by [Jason]", and Belinda Humfrey suggests that perhaps these are among the best poems Powys wrote. Jason is apparently based on Powys's brother Theodore Powys the novelist and writer of short stories.
- Darnley Otter: His brother. At the end of the novel he marries Mattie Smith.
- Lord Carfax: A cousin and former lover of Wolf's mother. He found Wolf his job with Urquhart, and at the end of the novel intervenes to help various people, including restoring Gerda's ability to whistle, which she lost during her marriage to Wolf.
- James Redfern: He was Urquhart's secretary before Wolf and he drowned in Lenty Pond "in mysterious circumstances". It appears that Urquhart was in love with this "beautiful young man". The local people refer to Wolf as Redfern Two, "and wait for him to drown in Lenty Pond".
- Roger Monk: Urquhart's manservant.
- Bob Weevil: A shop assistant, Wolf's main rival for Gerda'a affections, who cuckolds him.
- Lobbie Torp: Gerda's young brother.
- Malakite: A pornographic bookseller in Blacksod. At the end of the novel, dying after falling down the stairs, he tells Wolf that Christie pushed him.
- Olwen: She is the child of an incestuous union between Malakite and his elder daughter.
- Stalbridge: A waiter who Wolf "has identified as the incarnation of that suffering face" on the steps of Waterloo Station. He is one of those Lord Carfax helps at the end of Wolf Solent.
- T. E. Valley: A clergyman and one of several homosexual characters in the novel.

=== The face on the Waterloo steps ===
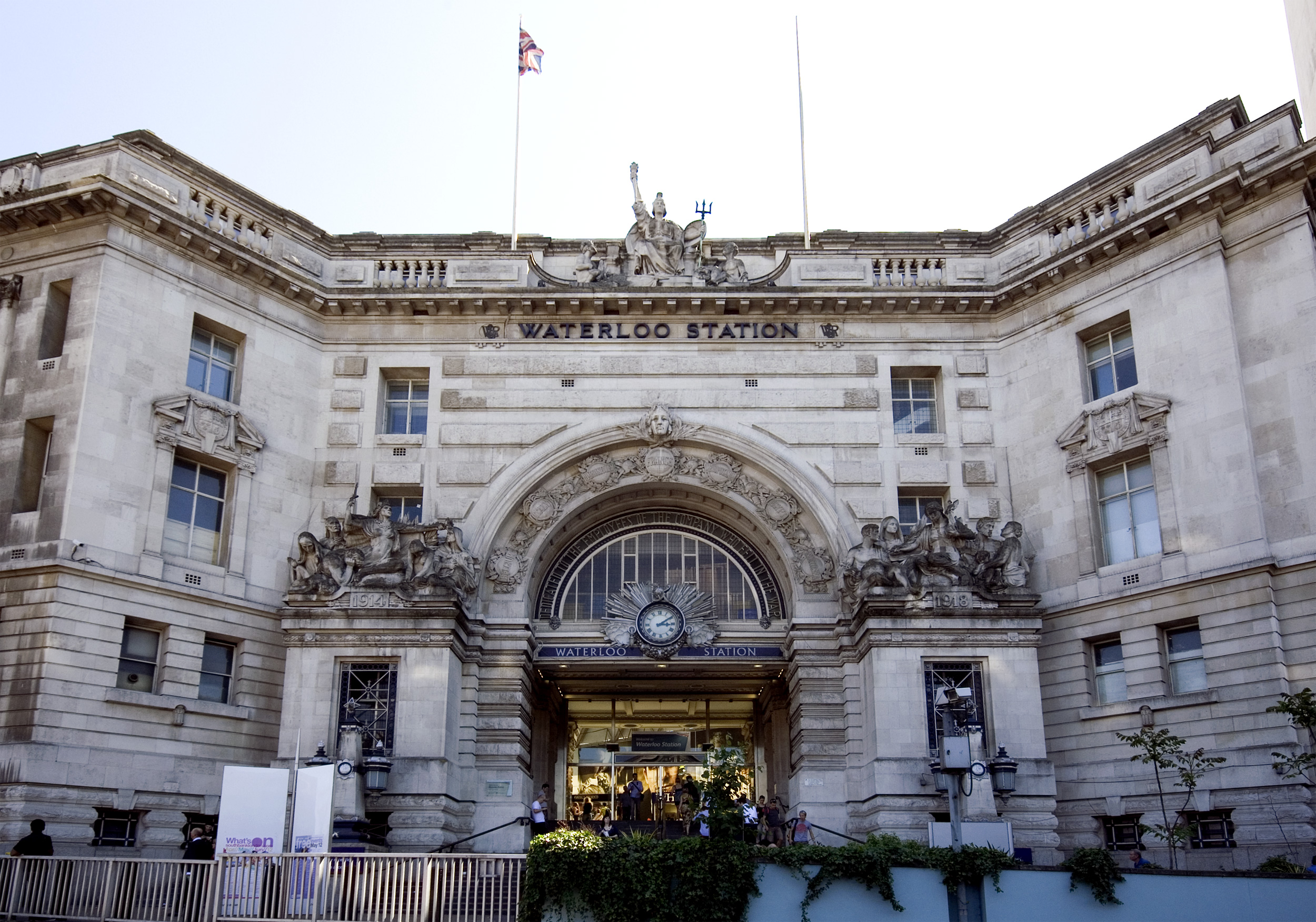
Victory Arch, Waterloo station's main entrance, where Wolf Solent had seen the look of "inert despair" on a man's face. The arch was a memorial to the dead of World War I.

An important recurring image in the novel is that of the face on the steps of Waterloo Station in London, which precipitates Wolf's emotion collapse in front of his history class, and loss of his job. The face of "a man regarded by Wolf as an epitome of the kind of suffering which challenges belief in a benevolent creator". In a letter to his brother Llewelyn, written from Chicago on 18 February 1925, in which Powys mentions working on Wolf Solent, he refers to a beggar that he had seen with "a 'shocking' face". Professor Peter Easingwood suggests that from this encounter came the idea for the face which forms such a "dominant pattern of symbolic imagery" in the novel. This face "of inert despair" is seen by Wolf as linked to "the appalling misery of so many of his fellow Londoners".

Morine Krissdottir in her biography of Powys, Descents of Memory, dates the action of the novel as taking place between March 1921 and May 1922, just three years after the end of World War I and notes that a "triumphal Victory Arch" was formally opened as the main entrance to Waterloo Station in London on 21 March 1922, to be a memorial to the dead. She also records that "in an ironic twist, the steps [of the Victory Arch] soon became a place where beggars, many of them mentally and physically crippled ex-servicemen, gathered". Furthermore, she also suggests that while there is no direct reference to the war in Wolf Solent "the metaphors and imagery" do in fact allude to it, and that "[t]he novel is in fact about a world after the great war--a world in which everything is irrevocably changed".

== Critical reception ==
In his review of the British first edition, in The Spectator, 10 August 1929, writer and critic V. S. Pritchett wrote: Wolf Solent is a stupendous and rather glorious book […] The book is as beautiful and strange as an electric storm, and like the thunder on the Sinai, it is somewhat of a sermon." More recently, also in The Spectator, A. N. Wilson wrote: "The Wessex novels of John Cowper Powys — Wolf Solent (1929), A Glastonbury Romance (1933), Jobber Skald (also published as Weymouth Sands, 1935) and Maiden Castle (1937) — must rank as four of the greatest ever to be written in our language."

In his Introduction to the Penguin Classics edition of the book, A.N. Wilson asserts that Wolf Solent is a "great literary masterpiece". However, Wilson also notes that "this kind of writing is not going to appeal to every reader", and John Cowper Powys "has been expunged from the canon of English literature.

The author and journalist Simon Heffer considers Wolf Solent "to be the finest novel by an Englishman in the 20th century". However, Heffer also notes that Powys' name remains little known.

== Bibliography ==
- Cavaliero, Glen. John Cowper Powys, Novelist. Oxford: Clarendon Press, 1973, pp. 44–60.
- Humfey, Belinda, ed. John Cowper Powys's Wolf Solent: Critical Studies. Cardiff: University of Wales Press, 1990.
- Jones, Ben, ″The disfigurement of Gerda: Moral and Textual Problems in Wolf Solent″, The Powys Review 2, Winter 1977, pp. 20–27. <https://www.powys-society.org/1PDF/PR_02.pdf>. Accessed 8 August 2021.
- Krissdóttir, Morine. Descents of Memory: The Life of John Cowper Powys. New York: Overlook Duckworth, 2007, pp. 214–30.
- ______________ and Taylor, Kevin, 'Editorial' and 'Missing the Middle' in Wolf Solent the Six Deleted Chapters, The Powys Journal Volume XXXI Supplement, 2021, pp. 7–29.
- Lane, Denis, ed. In the Spirit of Powys: New Essays. London and Toronto: Associated University Presses, 1990, pp. 43–70.
- Powys, John Cowper. "Preface" to Wolf Solent. London: Macdonald, 1961, pp. v-vii.

== See also ==
- John Cowper Powys, Owen Glendower
- ________________, Porius: A Romance of the Dark Ages
- ________________. Autobiography
