= Owen Glendower (novel) =

1941 historical novel by John Cowper Powys

- First UK edition
- Author: John Cowper Powys
- Language: English
- Genre: Historical novel
- Publisher: Simon & Schuster (US); The Bodley Head (UK)
- Publication date: 1941
- Publication place: England
- Preceded by: Morwyn (1937)
- Followed by: Porius: A Romance of the Dark Ages (1951)

Owen Glendower: An Historical Novel by John Cowper Powys was first published in America in January 1941, and in the UK in February 1942. Powys returned to Britain from the United States in 1934, with his lover Phyllis Playter, living first in Dorchester, where he began work on his novel Maiden Castle. However, in July, 1935, they moved to the village of Corwen, Denbighshire, North Wales, historically part of Edeirnion or Edeyrnion, an ancient commote of medieval Wales that was once part of the Kingdom of Powys; it was at Corwen that he completed Maiden Castle (1936). This move to the land of his ancestors led Powys to write Owen Glendower the first of two historical novels set in this region of Wales; the other was Porius (1951). Owen, Powys's ninth novel, reflects "his increasing sense of what he thought of as his bardic heritage."

Powys has used Shakespeare's anglicised version of Owain Glyndŵr's name, "Owen Glendower" for the title of his novel. However, within the novel, he uses Owen Glyn Dŵr (sic) (most often just Owen). He also refers to Glyndŵr as "Owen ap Griffith" or "son of Griffith Fychan" (Welsh: Owain ap Gruffydd)

== The writing and publishing of the novel ==
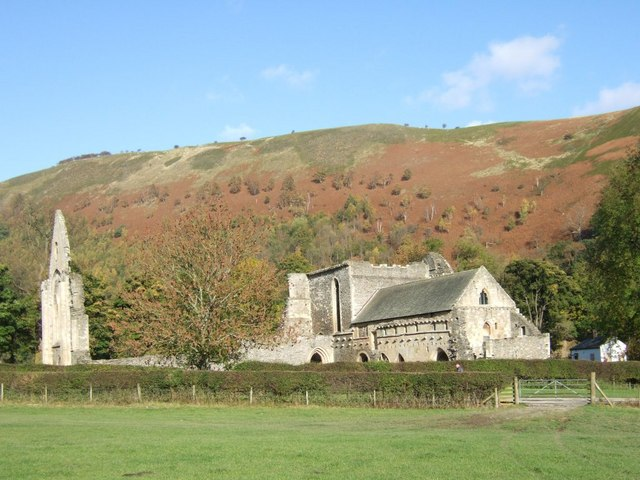
Valle Crucis Abbey where Powys began writing Owen on 24 April 1937.

It is not surprising that John Cowper Powys should, after he moved to Corwen, decide to begin a novel about Owain Glyndŵr, because it was in Corwen that Owain's rebellion against Henry IV began on 16 September 1400. This was when he formally assumed the ancestral title of Prince of Powys at his manor house of Glyndyfrdwy, then in the parish of Corwen. But Powys first had to complete Maiden Castle (1936), which he did in February 1936. He then worked on his anti-vivisection book, Morwyn (1937), which was finished in January 1937. However, already in September 1935 Phyllis Playter has suggested that he should write a historical novel about Owain Glyndŵr. On 24 April 1937, in the Chapter House, Abbey of Valle Crucis, Powys began, "my Romance about Owen Glendower ". Then on 25 June 1937 he visited Meifod, near Welshpool, noted as the royal burial ground of many of the kings and princes of the Welsh kingdom of Powys, and nearby Mathrafal, the seat of the Kings and Princes of Powys probably from the 9th century until its destruction in 1212 by Llywelyn ap Iorwerth of Gwynedd. He also visited Sycharth where Glendower had maintained a residence. These places would have an important role in Owen. During the next two years he thoroughly researched Owen Glendower, reading works such as J. E. Lloyd's Owen Glendower: Owain Glyn Dwr (1931) and J. H. Wylie's four volume, History of England under Henry the Fourth (1884–98), amongst others. Powys finished Owen on 24 December 1939, on the hill fort of Mynydd y Gaer, above Corwen, which, according to legend, was one of the places associated with Owain Glyndŵr's last days. Owen Glendower was first published by his American publisher Simon and Schuster in a two volume edition, in 1941, however, Powys had considerable difficulty getting the British edition published. Finally, after it was turned down by eight publishers, the Bodley Head agreed to publish it, though Powys only received £20 for this edition, which appeared in 1942. These difficulties were possibly related to the book's length and a war time paper shortage.

== Plot introduction ==
The subject is Owain Glyndŵr's uprising against King Henry IV, though "Powys has elected to cover only a few incidents in the revolt, principally during the years 1400-1405", with the novel's concluding chapter then jumping forward to November 1416 AD, and the death of Glyndŵr. Powys does not deal with the historical events in the intervening years, after 1405, when Glyndŵr was mainly in retreat, thus taking Glyndŵr's failure to take decisive military action at Woodbury Hill near Worcester as the effective end to the rebellion.

On 13 October 1399 Henry IV (1399–1413) had been crowned king, after deposing Richard II (6 January 1367- ca.14 February 1400) and imprisoning him. Then in February 1400 Richard had died in unexplained circumstances. On 16 September of that year Owain Glyndŵr's rebellion began.

The story of the rebellion of Owain Glyndŵr is seen through the eyes of his young relation, Rhisiart ab Owen of Hereford, for the first eleven chapters. Then, in the concluding paragraph of chapter XI the point of view switches to Glendower, and he remains "the centre of attention for the rest of the book". However, Powys "slips into full-scale omniscient narration, in which the narrator is presented as knowing virtually everything". In addition to Glyndŵr and his family, the cast of characters includes real historical figures such as Gruffydd Young and the Lollard Walter Brut. Likewise, the historical events described in the book, such as the Battle of Pilleth and the signing of the Tripartite Indenture, are a mixture of fact and fiction; some of the incidents, such as the death of Hywel Sele, are based on legend or oral tradition.

=== Synopsis ===
==== Summer 1400 ====
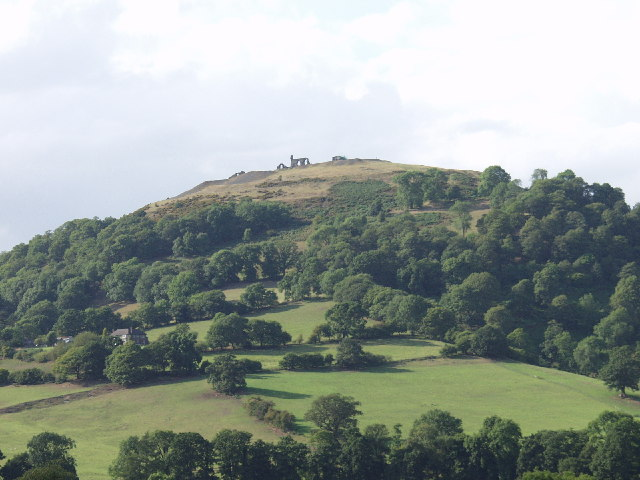
Dinas Bran, Llangollen. "Was he afraid that the sight of the real Dinas Brân would make the ideal one […] dissolve into air?" Owen Glendower (1941), p. 9.

On 23 June 1400, the Eve of St John's Day, a young Oxford student, Rhisiart ab Owen, is travelling towards Wales. He arrives at Dinas Bran Castle, high above Llangollen and just across the border from England, in a group that includes Walter Brut, a Lollard, and a group of monks led by the Abbot of Caerleon. Here he saves Mad Huw, who has preached that King Richard II of England is still alive, and a girl called Tegolin from being burned at the stake. Rhisiart and his fellow travellers then proceed to Owen’s stronghold at nearby Glyndyfrdwy, along with Owen Glendower's son Meredith.

Here after feasting and entertainment, they witness the death of the bard Iolo Goch, who with his last breath predicts Owen's rebellion. Rhisiart, Brut, Mad Huw, Master Young and a few other chosen individuals are summoned by Owen to give their opinions on the best course of action. During the meeting, a messenger arrives from the Pope in Rome. The following day, it is discovered that the papal messenger has taken word of the proposed rebellion to Owen's enemies, and that the Abbot at Valle Crucis is demanding hostages. These include Tegolin, Mad Huw, and Walter Brut. They travel to the Abbey accompanied by Rhisiart and are taken to Rhisiart's ancestral castle of Dinas Brân.

Rhisiart and Brut are held hostage in the castle for three months, when the castle receives an unexpected visit from a party including Harry Hotspur and the young Prince of Wales, Henry of Monmouth (the future King Henry V of England). With them are monks from Valle Crucis, one of whom turns out to be Owen Glendower in disguise. Rhisiart is rescued by Glendower, and in the course of the rescue Owen is hit by an arrow. Rhisiart, believing that it might have been poisoned, sucks blood from the wound.

Following this, in the concluding paragraph of Chapter XI, the narrative point of view switches from Rhisiart to Glendower.

The first eleven chapters of the novel, "no less than one-third of the novel's length" and "three months out of the time-span of sixteen years" are occupied with Rhisiart's arrival in Wales and subsequent imprisonment at Dinas Bran.

==== The Rebellion begins, 16 September 1400 ====
Owen reclaims the hostages and takes them to Glyndyfrdwy, where he is proclaimed Prince of Wales by his followers on 16 September 1400.

Banner adopted by Owain Glyndŵr and thought to be derived from the counter-charged arms of the princely Houses of Mathrafal and Dinefwr. It is currently in use by the National Eisteddfod for Wales, Cymdeithas yr iaith and widely amongst Welsh independentist groups.

Then almost two years pass, and Rhisiart begins a romance with Owen's daughter Catharine. At the Battle of Pilleth, on 22 June 1402, Owen is wounded but the Welsh are victorious. However, Rhisiart is horrified by the desecration of dead English bodies by a group of Welsh women. Mortimer, left unransomed by the English king, agrees to a marriage with Catharine that will give Owen the assistance of both the Mortimer and Percy dynasties. Rhisiart makes plans to elope with Catharine, but she refuses, choosing to obey her father's wishes.

A further two years go by and Owen negotiates the Tripartite Indenture with Hotspur's father, the Earl of Northumberland, which he signs in February 1405, despite the news of a defeat for his forces in the north and the fatal injuries to his trusted "captain", Rhys Gethin.

Rhisiart, Brut, Mad Huw and Father Rheinalt are scandalized when Owen forces Tegolin to appear before the assembled troops wearing golden armour, and they prepare to oppose the prince's scheme to take her into battle with him. Through their intervention, and that of his own son Meredith, Owen is persuaded to alter his plans, and he gives Tegolin to Rhisiart in marriage. Following the ceremony, Rhisiart foils an assassination attempt by Dafydd Gam at the chapel door.

Rhisiart and Tegolin are sent with an army to relieve the prince’s forces on the Usk, and the focus of the action shifts to Owen himself.

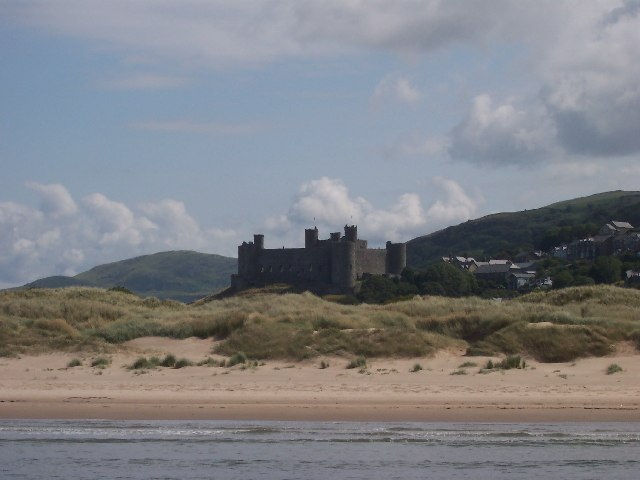
Harlech Castle was taken by Glendower in 1404 and recaptured by the English in 1409.

The important Battle of Pwll Melyn occurs in the spring of 1405, immediately north of Usk Castle, where English forces routed their Welsh opponents, causing much loss of life, including that of Owain's brother Tudur, and Rhisiart and Tegolin were taken prisoner, along with Owen’s eldest son Griffith.

==== 1405: Indecision at Worcester ====
Later in the summer of 1405 a French army lands safely in Milford Haven. A few months later, Rhisiart and Brut are prisoners in the city of Worcester when Owen arrives at nearby Woodbury Hill at the head of a large army, having recovered many of his losses with the aid of the French. He camps at Woodbury Hill, but he delays the decision to storm the city until it is too late, and is forced to retreat. John Cowper Powys treats this as the virtual end of Glendower's rebellion, and he does not deal with events in the years between 1405 and 1416, the year he believes Glendower died.

Rhisiart has been allowed a visit from Tegolin, who tells him that, by sleeping with the custodian, she has been able to obtain a guarantee that Rhisiart's life will be spared. She gives Rhisiart a phial containing a colourless liquid which she claims is "certain death". The two prisoners are interviewed by King Henry and the Archbishop of Canterbury. Rhisiart is condemned to the Tower of London and Brut to be burned at the stake. Rhisiart, in order to prevent his friend's suffering, tricks him into drinking the contents of the phial, and Brut dies instantly.

==== 1416: The death of Owen Glendower ====
The action of the chapter XX, the novel's penultimate chapter, ends in August 1405 (Owen Glendower (1941), pp. 787, 841), and in chapter XX1 the action moves forward to 1416. Powys treats the Battle of Worcester as the turning point and does not deal with subsequent battles. Owen's rebellion is over, and Henry V is now on the throne.

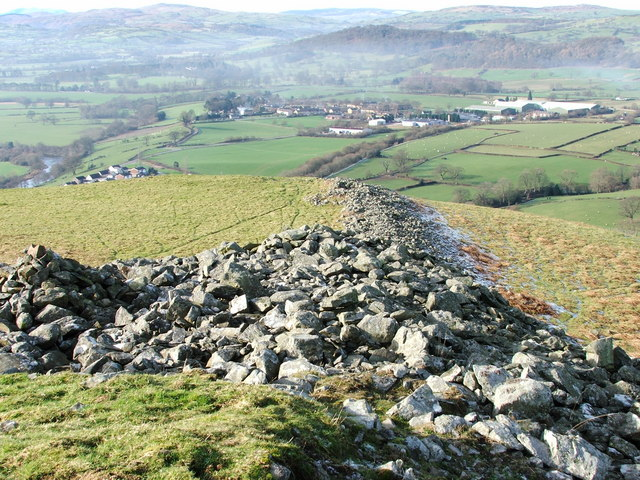
Caer Drewyn, Corwen, locally known as Mynydd-y-Gaer, the hill fort where Powys completed Owen Glendower on 24 December 1939. This is where, in the novel, Glendower dies

In November 1416, Rhisiart ab Owen, in the company of Lord Talbot, sent by Henry V to offer a pardon to Owen, is preceding to Owen's hiding place beneath the hill-fortress of Mynydd-y-Gaer, above Corwen, where he lives with Broch. But by the time they arrive he is dying, and Glendower passes away just at the moment the pardon is about to be bestowed. The book ends with Glendower's son, Meredith, returning from his father's cremation and there is an atmosphere of optimism about the future of Wales.

The fates of the remaining major characters are made known in the course of the final chapter. Tegolin and Rhisiart, who is now an English judge, have a daughter, Catharine, and are due to be reunited at last, just as the book ends.

== Major characters ==
- Owen Glendower, or Owen Glyn Dŵr (sic). Also "Owen ap Griffith" or "son of Griffith Fychan" (Welsh: Owain ap Gruffydd). Powys makes use of historian J. E. Lloyd for "the 'documented' events of Owen Glyn Dwr's (sic) life." But Powys notes that even "a trained and judicious modern historian" like Lloyd alludes to the legends associated with Glendower: '"no bard attempted to sing his elegy; this we must attribute, not merely to the mystery which shrouded his end, but also to the belief that he had but disappeared, and would rise again in his wrath in the hour of his country's sorest need."' Powys makes use of this legend as well the one that Glendower was a magician. Shakespeare alludes to the idea that Glendower was a magician in Henry IV, Part 1.
- Rhisiart ab Owen, is a young university student from Hereford in England, of Welsh and Norman ancestry, who like "many Welsh students at Oxford" is travelling to support Owen Glendower. He is listed by Powys as one of the novel's historical characters and is a cousin of Glendower "by bastard descent". At the end of the novel in 1416 he has become a judge. Coincidentally Powys records, in his "Argument" to the novel, that Glendower had been a law student at Westminster and that his wife's father "was appointed a Judge in the Court of King's Bench" in 1383.
- Broch o' Meifod, "the Badger of Meifod", is a "giantic miller", "a person of Herculean proportions", and a friend of Owen Glendower. Meifod, along with nearby Mathrafal, is important in Welsh history because of associations with the rulers of the Kingdom of Powys. G. Wilson Knight describes Broch as representing "the ancient Welsh stock in comparison with which Owen himself is regarded as a half-breed".
- Morg ferch Lug, Broch's wife who, unlike her husband, is an "astonishing little being". She puts a curse on Owen Glendower.
- Mad Huw is a Grey Friar from the monastery at Llanfaes, Anglesea who believes King Richard II is still alive.
- Walter Brut was a fourteenth-century writer from the Welsh borders, whose trial in 1391 is a notable event in the history of Lollardy. The historical Brut described himself as "a sinner, a layman, a farmer and a Christian" in his trial for heresy which took place before the Bishop of Hereford, Thomas Trefnant. Unlike Powys's fictional character he did not join Glendower until about 1402. Lollardy was a political and religious movement that existed from the mid-14th century to the English Reformation. The term lollard refers to the followers of John Wycliffe, a prominent theologian who was dismissed from the University of Oxford in 1381 for criticism of the Church, especially in his doctrine on the Eucharist. The Lollards' demands were primarily for reform of Western Christianity. Powys discusses the impact of John Wycliffe's ideas in his "Argument" to Owen Glendower. Glendower engages Brut to help him reform Welsh religion and education.
- Lowri ferch Ffraid. She arouses Rhisiart's latent sadism and "he is both terrified and stirred by contact with" Lowri's "seductive evil".
- Tegolin ferch Lowri, is Lowri's illegitimate daughter. A "flame-haired girl", who is a follower of Mad Huw. Glendower plans to send into battle against the English dressed in a suit of golden armor, and G. Wilson Knight describes her as being like "a Saint Joan, a 'vision". Joan of Arc lived closed to the time of the novel, ca.1412[5] – 30 May 1431. However, Glendower changes his mind and arranges that she will marry Rhisiart.
- Iolo Goch was a medieval Welsh bard who composed poems addressed to Owain Glyndŵr, among others. One of his three poems composed for Owain Glyndŵr includes a vivid description of Owain's hall at Sycharth.
- Derfel Gadarn is presented by Powys as a combination of both pagan leader and saint. His image at Llandderfel was destroyed during the sixteenth century, but that of his horse is preserved at Llandderfel church. Derfel, known as Derfel Gadarn ("mighty, valiant, strong") was a 6th-century British Christian monk, regarded as a saint. Local legend holds that he was a warrior of King Arthur.
- King Richard II. (1367–ca.14 February 1400) was King of England from 1377 until he was deposed on 30 September 1399, exactly a year before Glendower's uprising, when Henry Bolingbroke "with the consent of Parliament and the support of the Commons deposed" him and was crowned Henry IV. Powys, following "[o]ur best historian of Henry's reign, Mr James Hamilton Wylie, thinks it probable that Richard II was murdered" in 1400.
- Henry IV of England (1367–1413). He reigned 1399–1413.
- King Henry V (1386–1422). King of England 1413-1422.
- Sir Henry Percy (1364–1403), "Hotspur", eldest son of the 1st Earl of Northumberland. He is a character in Shakespeare's Henry IV, Part 1.

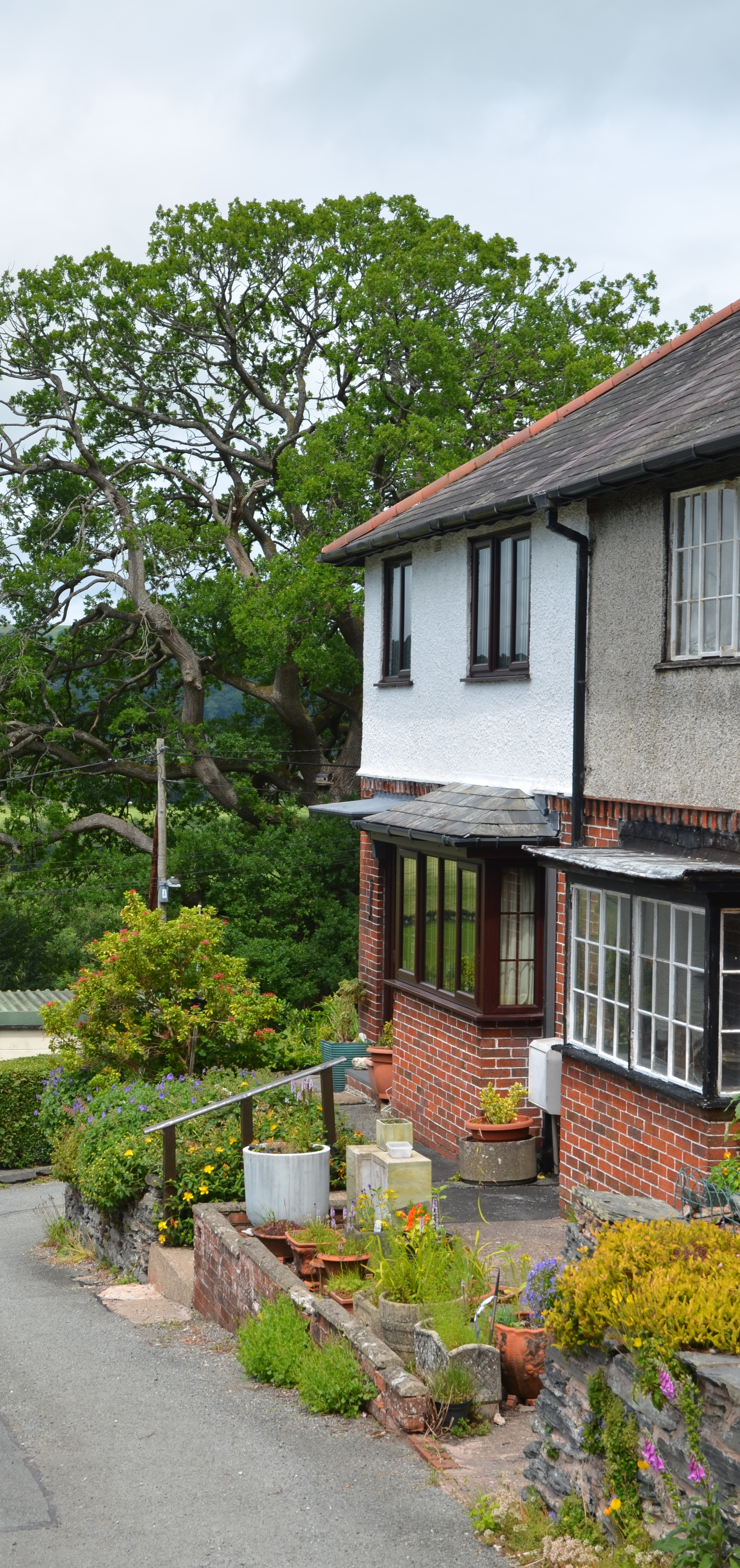
7 Cae Coed, Corwen, Denbighshire, Powys's home during the years in which he wrote Owen Glendower

== Historical novel or romance? ==
When John Cowper Powys began Owen Glendower in April 1937 he referred to it in his diary, as "my Romance about Owen Glyn Dwr", but then, in subsequent years, he generally referred to it as a historical novel, and it was so sub-titled when it was published. This description of the novel is supported by a scholarly introduction, or "Argument", giving historical background both to Glendower and to the period, which indicates, Powys had thoroughly researched his subject. Indeed the novel reveals that "Powys was no amateur in the academic world" (Note: Herbert Davies comments, in John Cowper Powys (Brigend: Seren,1997). p. 125: "The Argument he appends to the novel shows an awesome grasp of the historical context". Glen Cavaliero, John Cowper Powys: Novelist (Oxford: The Clarendon Press, 1973), p. 107: "The whole background of fifteenth-century Wales is presented with unobtrusive artistry".) But Welshman Roland Mathias, is highly critical of Powys's handling of Welsh history, arguing that he "chooses to ignore the heart and spirit of early fifteenth-century Wales in favour of a deep-rooted theory of his own". (Note: But another Welshman, Meirion Pennar, has a more favourable opinion. "In Search of the Real Glendower", Powys Review, 18 (1986), pp. 20-23. See also Jeremy Hooker's sensitive response to Mathias, "John Cowper Powys: Figure of the Marches", in Imagining Wales (Cardiff: University of Wales Press, 2001), pp. 95-6.)

Powys's approach to the historical novel genre is influenced by Walter Scott -- "by far the most powerful literary influence on my life"—and both Edward Waverley (Waverley, 1814) and the eponymous hero of Quentin Durward (1823) have been suggested as models for Rhisiart. However, though Scott is generally seen as a major influence of the modern version of the historical novel, his novels are also frequently described as historical romances, and Northrop Frye suggested "the general principle that most 'historical novels' are romances".

In fact Powys's preferred genre was the romance, though Morine Krissdottir maintains that Owen Glendower "unlike the other novels, is not a 'romance' but a 'history' ", and Glen Cavaliero argues that "the normal definitions of romance hardly serve to define" Powys's novels, which "call into question our normal usage of the word 'novel' ". Jeremy Hooker, however, describes both Owen and Porius as " 'Welsh Romances' " and relates this to Powys "drawing on a tradition of storytelling far older than that of any 'historical novelist'" and suggests that "[i]n a way, he is close to the medieval Arthurian romances". Hooker also emphasises the influence of the Welsh mythological classic The Mabinogion on this novel, stating "that the mythology is more essential, more integral, to this romance than its historical circumstances are". Another view, while accepting that Owen is a historical novel, sees it as "a marvellous blend of historicity and vision, of mythology and romance".

But, as Canadian scholar W. J. Keith notes, "all three terms (novel, romance, and historical novel) have been employed and argued about" for nearly two hundred years, that is at least since the time of Walter Scott. He also makes the further point that such questions relating to genre are important if the intentions of an author are not to be "distorted".

== Myth and legend ==
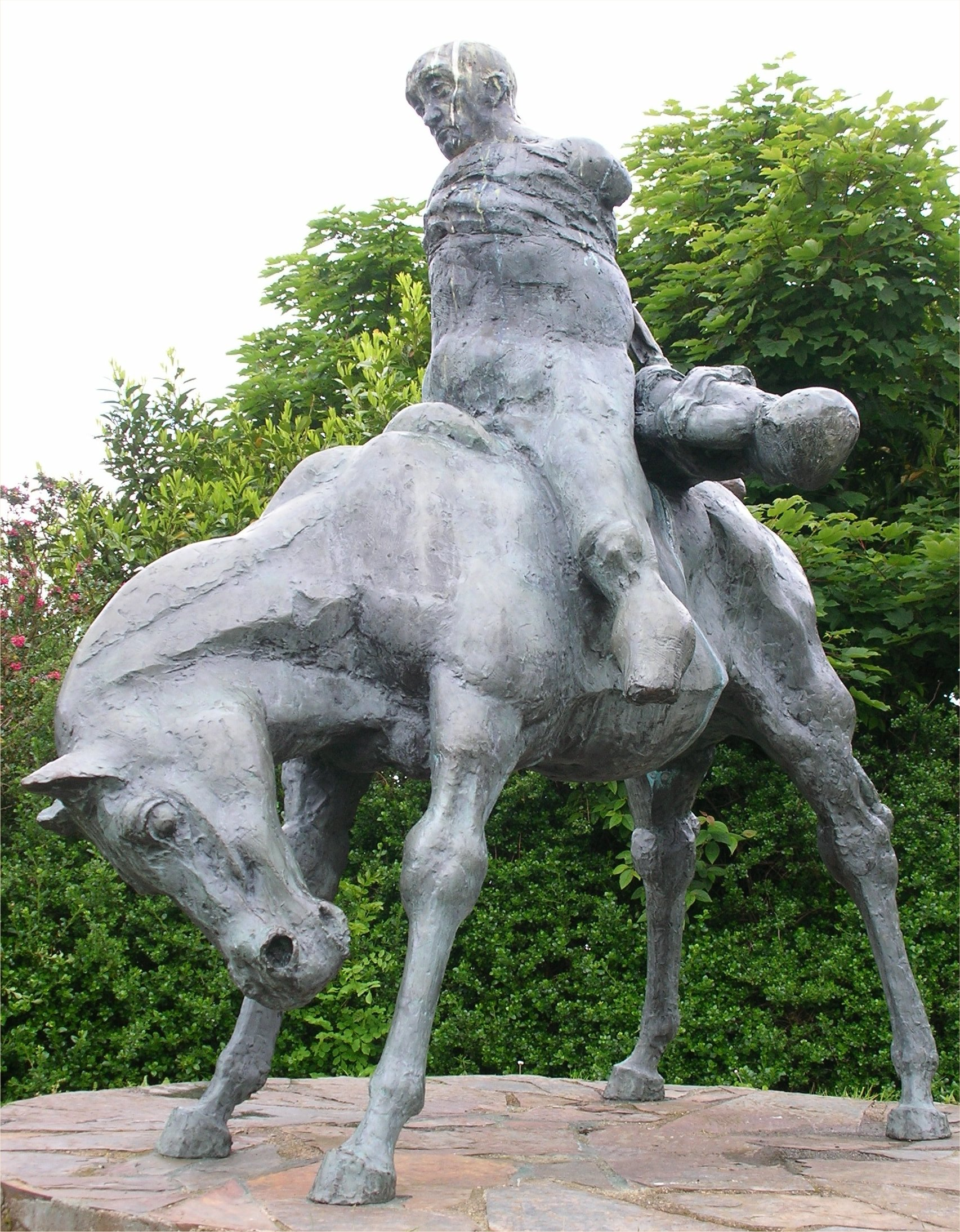
The Two Kings (sculptor Ivor Roberts-Jones, 1984) near Harlech Castle, Wales. King Brân the Blessed carries the body of his nephew Gwern

While Powys's starting point in this novel is the historical facts about Owen Glendower and the early fifteenth century, found in the works of historians such as J. E. Lloyd and J. H. Wylie, he also draws on legend, especially those relating to the mysterious disappearance of Glendower, and the idea that he was a magician. (Note: W. J. Keith notes that "[J. H.] Wylie records, among the 'many marvellous stories that got around about Owen', one that claimed he possessed a 'magical stone' by which 'he could render himself invisible at will' (I, 286)" (Keith, p. 51).) In addition Powys makes use of literature, including the poetry of Iolo Goch, Shakespeare's Henry IV (Part I), and Lady Charlotte Guest's The Mabinogion, a collection of eleven prose stories collated from medieval Welsh manuscripts. The Welsh mythology of this latter work, especially the Four Branches of the Mabinogi (from which Guest derived her title), is particularly important in Owen Glendower and in Powys's next novel Porius. Jeremy Hooker sees The Mabinogion as having "a significant presence […] through character's knowledge of its stories and identification of themselves or others with figures or incidents in the stories". When Rhisiart, for example, first sees Owen Glendower, he remarks, "I'll be damned if he doesn't look like […] Pryderi!", while earlier, in Chapter Two, Tegolin remarks that when Rhisiart defended her he "looked like Pwyll […] riding against Halfgan […] King of Annwn. Indeed there are "almost fifty allusions to these four […] tales"' (The Four Branches of the Mabinogi) in the novel, though "some that are fairly obscure and inconspicuous". Two thirds of Powys's allusions are from "Branwen, daughter of Llŷr", whose main character is Brân the Blessed, Bendigeidfran, a giant and king of Britain, who Powys associates with the fortress of Rhisiart's ancestors, Castell Dinas Brân (though there is no known connection with the castle and this mythological hero). There are also important associations between Bran and another setting in the novel, Harlech. Powys also draws on "Culhwch and Olwen" (a tale about a hero connected with King Arthur and his warriors), the "Book of Taliesin", both also found in Guest's Mabinogion, as well as mentioning Merlin, and the poet Aneirin, so that is "clear that [he] intended his ideal reader to be made perpetually aware of the ancient Welsh mythical and literary heritage". Pryderi, Pwll, and Bran are midway "between gods and human beings", and can move "freely between the human world and Annwn, the Welsh 'Otherworld'". Jeremy Hooker, goes so far as to propose that "the mythology is more essential, more integral, to this romance than its historical circumstances are". However, Glen Cavaliero suggests that "the mythogical element" is more "a kind of continuous undertow" and "for the most part it is the outward action which carries the message of the [novel]".

Another aspect to this is the myth Powys himself creates around his belief that the Welsh and indeed the British as a whole "are descended from [what he calls] the Welsh aboriginals, the Neolithic Iberian inhabitants of Britain, and that this is the main racial and cultural ingredient of the British, rather than that supplied by the Celts or Anglo-Saxons". This led Powys to the idea that the mythology of the Mabinogion records the defeat of the "essentially pacific" Welsh aboriginals by the later Celts. Keith suggests that these "assumptions" by Powys "are essential for understanding both Owen Glendower and [Powys's later Welsh novel] Porius ".

== Themes ==
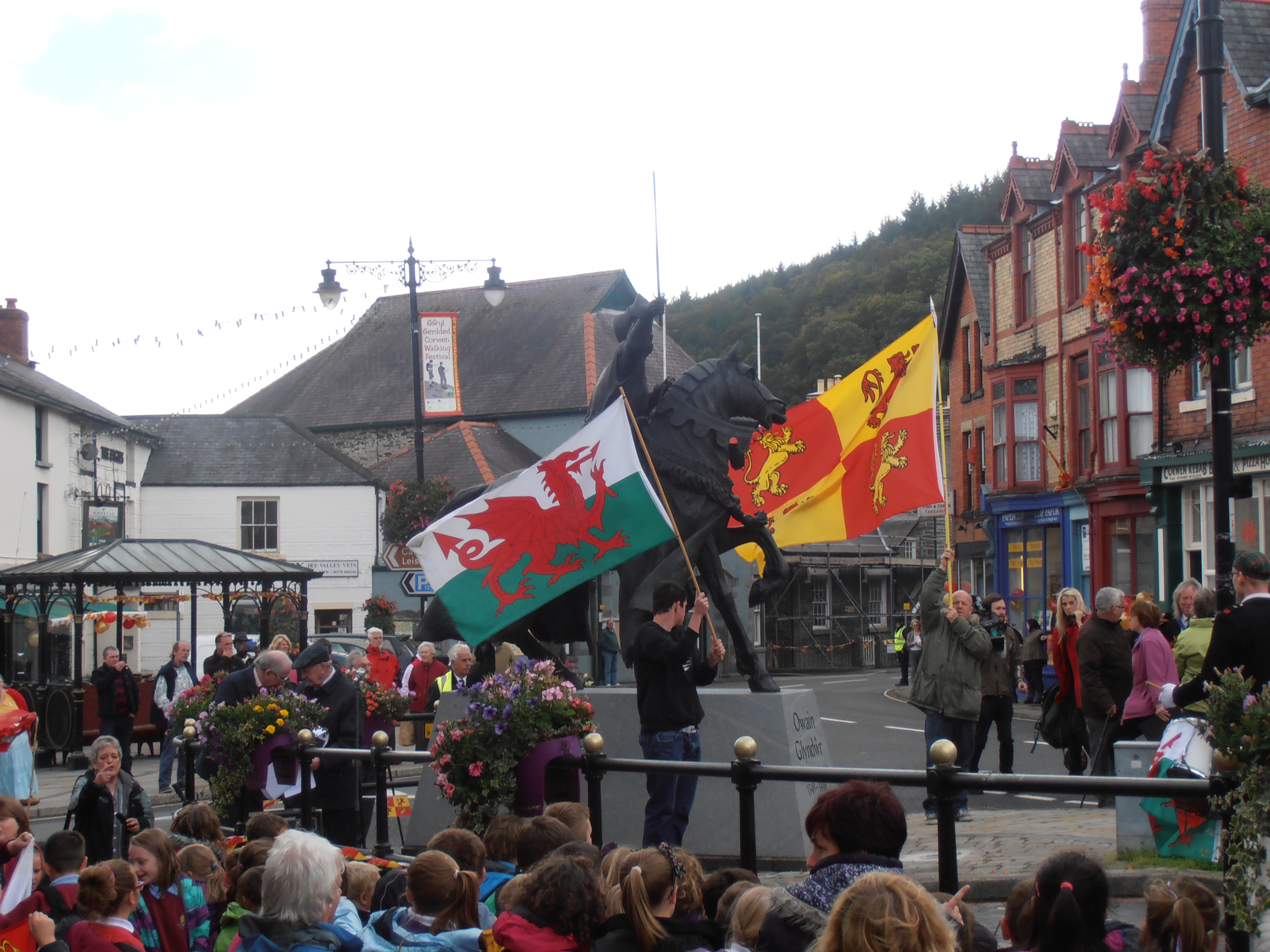
The statue of Owain Glyndŵr in Corwen. Celebration September 16, 2013, commemorating Glyndwr's uprising on this date in 1400.

=== A novel of World War II ===
An important aspect of Owen Glendower are historical parallels between the beginning of the fifteenth century and the late 1930s and early 1940s: "A sense of contemporaneousness is ever present in Owen Glendower. We are in a world of change like our own". The novel was conceived at a time when the "Spanish Civil War (Note: On the April 26, 1937, two days after Powys began his novel, the Spanish town of Guernica, was bombed by the Nazi Germany's Luftwaffe. It inspired the painting Guernica by Pablo Picasso.) was a major topic of public debate" and completed on 24 December 1939, a few months after World War II had begun. In the "Argument" that prefaced the (American) first edition of 1941, Powys comments "the beginning of the fifteenth century […] saw the beginning of one of the most momentous and startling epochs of transition that the world has known". This was written in May 1940, and "[t]here can be no doubt" that readers of the novel would have "registered the connection between the actions of the book and the events of their own world".

However, this novel is about a rebellion that was defeated, and a principal theme is "the nature of defeat in relation to its two principal characters" Glendower and Rhisiart. At the beginning of the novel, Rhisiart has a "romantic vision" "of redeeming the record of an ancestor", and his relationship to Glendower and the latter's national aspiration are central to this. However, Rhisiart ends up, "ironically enough […] an English judge". Glendower likewise gives up his romantic dream. He is an introspective and indecisive leader and the defeat of the Welsh arises because of Owen's refusal "to do violence to his own principles […] to his life-illusion, by unnecessary bloodshed".

=== The mythology of escape ===
Many critics have noted the importance of the idea of the "mythology of escape" in Owen Glendower. Indeed this philosophy of Glendower is the means whereby Powys transforms his protagonist's historical defeat by the English "into a kind of triumph". Indeed after his defeat at Worcester Glendower refers to his "triumph in spirit". Powys describes this "mythology of escape", in his essay "Welsh Culture" (1939), as "the secret of the people of this land [Wales]" and goes on to note that "[o]ther races love and hate, conquer and are conquered. This race [the Welsh] avoids and evades, pursues and is pursued. Its route forever makes double flight". Welsh writer Herbert Williams "finds disturbing hints of other Powys heroes or anti-heroes, traces in fact of Powys himself" in this version of history's Owen Glendower. Cambridge poet and scholar Glen Cavaliero also notes that Glendower is "an elementalist of the kind depicted in so many of John Cowper's novels". Indeed the "mythology of escape" is just such a contemplative philosophy and it is this—with its propensity for contemplation and introspection—that proves "fatal to his hopes of delivering Wales". What Glendower does is turns a physical defeat into a spiritual victory, because, "[h]e could not act as an aggressor […] [h]e knew how his soul could escape, escape without looting cities and ravishing women".

Owen Glendower's introspective nature is explored by Harald Fawkner, in The Ecstatic World of John Cowper Powys, where he comments on the contrast between Rhisiart's lack of introspection: "[h]e has 'all the average Norman's dislike of introspective analysis' ", and Glendower's constant self-examination, and Fawkner suggests that the novelist identified with Glendower. Fawkner quotes from Powys's Confessions of Two Brothers, in which the Powys deplores "widely spread" current view that " 'introspection' is a dangerous and immoral thing". Like Powys himself and his other fictional heroes, Glendower, Fawkner argues, is "caught in a tremendous struggle between Ego and Self". Jeremy Hooker also emphasize this aspect of Owen Glendower, suggesting that Powys is less interested in "political and military matters" than in "consciousness, uses of the mind and will, and emotional and sexual experience".

Cavaliero sees "the struggle for Wales [as] emblematic of a more universal struggle in the human spirit; history has become a myth." Powys's Owen Glendower is not only shaped by history but by legend and mythology and following his defeat and disappearance: "[I]n the Welsh imagination Glyndwr has become a combination of King Arthur and the wizard Merlin", and Powys transforms the genre of historical novel into "pure romance", through the idea of a "mythology of escape".

=== Father and son ===
The relationship between Rhisiart and Owen is a central theme, with Rhisiat calling Owen father and vice versa, and similarities have been suggested with Stephen Dedalus and Leopold Bloom in James Joyce's Ulysses. The theme is also, of course, explored in other of Powys's novels, most notably Wolf Solent and Porius. Rhisiart and Owen also resemble each other in several significant ways: "[b]oth, for example, are forced to come to terms […] with the inevitable clash between the dream possibilities of Romance and the harsh realities of life in this world". They also both suffer from "strange seizures" and have a cruel sadistic side, though they both also exhibit compassion. All the same there is at least one important difference as noted by Harald Fawkner above.

== Critical reputation ==
In the New Yorker in January 1941 Clifton Fadiman suggested:

Only readers with oodles of time and patience or those already permanently committed to the odd talent of John Cowper Powys will be able to master the complex maze of Owen Glendower, with its Welsh names, its theological squabbles, its mad priests and fanatical Lollards, its hazy nationalist intrigues, and its thick 'magical' atmosphere. There can be no doubt that the novel is a mountainous achievement.

However, in a 2002 novelist Margaret Drabble, in a review, commented that Powys's portrayal of Glendower is "more Welsh, more authentic, more tragic and more mythical than Shakespeare's". Jan Morris called it "one of the most fascinating of all historical novels about one of the most tantalizing of historical figures", while Glen Cavaliero calls Owen Glendower "Powys's definitive and crowning work".

== See also ==
- Autobiography
- A Glastonbury Romance
- Porius: A Romance of the Dark Ages
- Weymouth Sands
- Wolf Solent

== Select bibliography ==
- Cavaliero, Glen. John Cowper Powys: Novelist. Oxford: Clarendon Press, 1973, pp. 107–19.
- Keith, W. J. Owen Glendower: a Reader's Companion, 2007
- _________ .Aspects of John Cowper Powy's 'Owen Glendower' . London: The Powys Society, 2008.
- Krissdottir, Morine. "Introduction" to John Cowper Powys, Owen Glendower (Charlebury, Oxfordshire: Walcott, 2002), and (New York: Overlook Press, 2003), pp. ix-xxii
- _________. Owen Glendower: Historical Novel or Romance?" la lettre powysiennenuméro 13, printemps 2007.
- La Lettre Powysienne No. 4, automne 2002. Various articles in French and English.
- Lloyd, J. E.. Owen Glendower: Owain Glyn Dwr. Oxford: Clarendon Press, 1931.*Mathias, Roland. "John Cowper Powys and ‘Wales’." Powys Review 17 (1985), pp.5-26.
- __________. "The Sacrificial Prince: A Study of Owen Glendower." In Essays on John Cowper Powys, ed. Belinda Humfrey. Cardiff: University of Wales Press, 1972, pp. 233–61.
- Powys, John Cowper. Owen Glendower, 2 vols. (New York:Simon and Schuster, [1941]) and, in one vol., (London: The Bodley Head, [1942]).
- ___________________. _________________, New York: Overlook Press, 2003, and Charlebury, Oxon.: Walcott Books, 2002.
- ___________________. Obstinate Cymric: Essays 1935-1947. Carmarthen: Druid Press, 1947.
- Wylie, J. H.. History of England Under Henry the Fourth, 4 vols. London: Longmans, 1884-98.
