= Maiden Castle (novel) =

1936 novel by John Cowper Powys

- First edition (US)
- Author: John Cowper Powys
- Language: English
- Genre: Novel
- Published: 1936 US, 1937 UK
- Publisher: Simon & Schuster (US); Cassell (UK)
- Media type: Print
- Preceded by: Weymouth Sands (1934), Autobiography (1934)
- Followed by: Morwyn (1937)

Maiden Castle by John Cowper Powys was first published in 1936 and is the last of Powys so-called Wessex novels, following Wolf Solent (1929), A Glastonbury Romance (1932), Weymouth Sands (1934). Powys was an admirer of Thomas Hardy, and these novels are set in Somerset and Dorset, part of Hardy's mythical Wessex. American scholar Richard Maxwell describes these four novels "as remarkably successful with the reading public of his time". Maiden Castle is set in Dorchester, Dorset Thomas Hardy's Casterbridge, and which Powys intended to be a "rival" to Hardy's Mayor of Casterbridge. Glen Cavaliero describes Dorchester as "vividly present throughout the book as a symbol of the continuity of civilization. The title alludes to the Iron Age, hill fort Maiden Castle that stands near to Dorchester.

Powys, along with Phyllis Playter, returned permanently to England in June 1934 and, while staying near the village of Chaldon, Dorset, Powys began Maiden Castle in late August 1934, In October 1934 they moved to Dorchester but then they moved again, to Corwen North Wales, in July 1935, where Maiden Castle was completed in February 1936.

Until 1990 Maiden Castle was only available in an abridged version, because Powys original typescript of Maiden Castle had been reduced by about one-fifth of its original length for the previous editions. In 1990 the University of Wales Press published "the first full authoritative edition" under the editorship of Ian Hughes.

== Plot ==
Maiden Castle is about "the difficult relationship of a historical novelist [Dud No-Man] [...] and a young circus acrobat [Wizzie Raveleston]. Another major character, the novelist's father [Uryen Quirm] believes that he is "the incarnation of a Welsh god". Uryen tries "to reawake the old gods once worshipped" at Maiden Castle, but he fails in this, just as his son fails in his relationship with Wizzie.

== Characters ==
The characters in Maiden Castle have strange sounding names;

- Dud No-man, 'the Hero of the Romance', about forty years old. He was nick-named Dud by his dead wife because he failed to consummate their marriage. He is writing an historical novel about Mary Channing, who was in 1706 burnt at the stake in Dorchester for poisoning her husband. Thomas Hardy was somewhat "obsessed" with Channing's execution, and three characters in The Mayor of Casterbridge, were surrogates of Channing.
- Wizzie Ravelstone, 'Heroine of the Romance', and companion of Dud. She is about twenty, and previously a circus performer. Dud 'buys her from Old Funky. At the end of the novel, frustrated by her life with Dud, "Wizzie goes off with Thuella to America"
- Lovie Ravelston, Wizzie's daughter by Mr Urgan.
- Enoch Quirm, who is also called Uryen. A somewhat 'sinister figure', linked to Wales. He changed his Biblical name "Enoch" to "Uryen", that of "a prince in Welsh mythology ... of whom he thinks himself a reincarnation" Nancy his wife is twenty years younger than him.
- Professor Tuecer Wye, 'a student of Plato'.
- Dunbar Wye,'Dumbell', a Fascist.
- Thuella Wye, a painter, 'mostly of clouds', whose 'name in Greek means a Storm-Cloud' (see Aello).
- Mr Urgan ('Old Funky'). The circus manager who seduced Wizzie.
- Mr Cask, 'Claudius'. A passionate Communist.

== Setting ==
Like A Glastonbury Romance and Weymouth Sands, Maiden Castle is set in a small, named English town. In 2021 Dorchester had a population of around 21,000. G. Wilson Knight, however, suggests that "we are little aware of Dorchester as a town".

A pre-historic earth-work, Maiden Castle, dating from Celtic or pre-Celtic times is of major importance. Associated with this ancient mound is Uryen attempt to get "into touch with the old gods of ... Maiden Castle", gods that he associates with "a civilization possessed of the secrets of life that Aryan science has destroyed", from a time "when there were no wars, no vivisection, no money, no ten-thousand-times accursed nations!"

=== Maiden Castle, hill fort ===
Maiden Castle is an Iron Age hillfort 1.6 mi (2.6 km) southwest of Dorchester, in the English county of Dorset. The earliest archaeological evidence of human activity on the site consists of a Neolithic causewayed enclosure and bank barrow. Maiden Castle itself was built in about 600 BC. Around 450 BC it was greatly expanded to make it the largest hill fort in Britain and, by some definitions, the largest in Europe. Maiden Castle has also provided inspiration for composer John Ireland and novelist Thomas Hardy. In the 1930s, archaeologist Mortimer Wheeler and Tessa Verney Wheeler undertook the first archaeological excavations at Maiden Castle, raising its profile among the public.

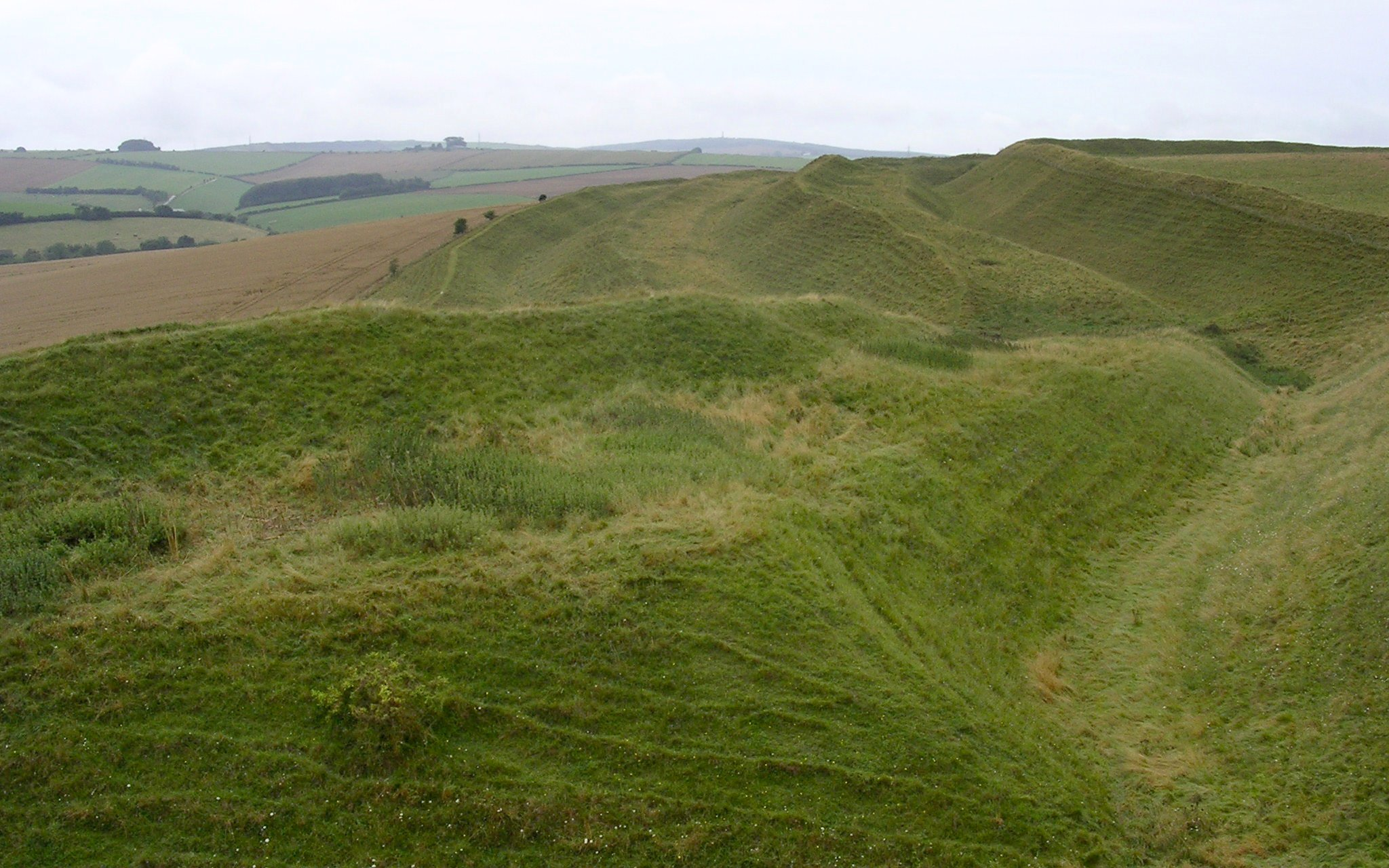
Maiden Castle, Dorset

== Welsh mythology ==
Uryen Quirm is linked with Welsh mythology, because he "believed that he had inherited the supernatural power that had resided in the Uryen of Welsh mythology"; that he is a reincarnation of Urien.

The source for the 'mythogical' Urien was the historical figure Owain mab Urien. He was transformed in Arthurian legend into the figure of king Urien of Garlot or Gorre. His most celebrated son, Owain, likewise gave his name to the Arthurian character of Ywain.

The hero of Owain, or the Lady of the Fountain, is based on the historical figure Owain mab Urien. This is one of the Three Welsh Romances (Welsh: Y Tair Rhamant), three Middle Welsh tales associated with the Mabinogion. He appears as Ywain in later continental tradition. The romance consists of a hero marrying his love, the Lady of the Fountain, but losing her when he neglects her for knightly exploits.

Jeremy Hooker, notes that Powys' source, for his ideas about Uryen, were Sir John Rhys' Studies in the Arthurian Legend (first published in 1891). Hooker discusses both Quirm's ideas relating to the idea that he is a reincarnation of a figure in Welsh literature and also his association of Uryen with Bran "'the dark divinity'" Rhys called 'God both of beginning and ending, of life and death' ".

== Sexuality ==
A central concern is "with sexuality in its repressed or cerebral forms". This is seen especially in the novel's central character, or hero, whose "unconventional and sterile love-making is deliberately reflected in his name, Dud No-man". Dud "has for ten years made nightly "love" to his own dead wife who in the body had meant little to him". His subsequent relationship with Wizzie is equally sterile. Wizzie's departure to follow her vocation as a circus acrobat "is a protest against Dud's kind of sexual love".

Wilson Knight sees similarities between Dud's way of making love and that of "other Powys-heroes", as well as also Sylvanus Cobbold (from Weymoth Sands). Knight refers to "Sylvanus's cerebral Thibetan fashion" of love-making. Though Sylvanus sleep with the young girl Marrett, he is not interested in intercourse: this is ‘“cerebral” lust’ (Krissdóttir, p. 76).

Morine Krissdottir suggests that for Dud consummation equals "powerlessness" that is a man can only "retain his creative potency, his power" so long as "his wife remains a 'virgin'."

According to Dud, Uryen Quirm also believes that through ' "frustrated love" ' he can ' "touch some great secret" '; and that ' "Thel's love for Wizzie was like that" '.

== Critical response ==
When the novel appeared in Britain in 1937 Geoffrey H. Wells, in a review in the Times Literary Supplement, wrote: The total effect is rather that of a celestial – or demonic – Punch and Judy show. All the characters are, by ordinary standards, grotesques, eccentric physically and mentally". More recently, Morine Krissdottir, in her biography of Powys, describes the plot of Maiden Castle as "absurd" and "the characters over-the-top", while "the dialogue is often unintentionally comic". However, she still finds that the novel "sticks in the mind". Glen Cavaliero also recognises that much of this novel is "implausible", but he suggests that "it takes on a hypnotic reality in the encounters between its leading characters", and he also comments, that though Uryen's "mad quest may have its ludicrous side", he "remains an impressive haunting figure". Cavaliero describes it as "perhaps the most Powysian of all the novels".

== Bibliography ==
- Cavaliero, Glen. John Cowper Powys, Novelist. Oxford: Clarendon Press, 1973, pp. 93–102
- Christensen, Peter G. The "Dark Gods" and Modern Society: Maiden Castle and The Plumed Serpent, in In the Spirit of Powys: New Essays, ed. Denis Lane. Cranbury, NJ: Associated University Presses, 1990, pp. 157–179.
- Humfrey, Belinda, ed.The Powys Review. Index to critical articles and other material (including articles by Ian Hughes in nos, 12 and 15):
- Keith, W. J. "Three personal readings of Maiden Castle"
- Knight, G. Wilson. The Saturnian Quest. London: Methuen,1964, pp. 47–55, 77–80.
- Krissdottir, Morine. Descents of Memory: The Life of John Cowper Powys. New York: Overlook Duckworth, 2007, pp. 312–321
- Lock, Charles, ed. The Powys Journal. Another source for critical articles.
- Moran, Margaret. "Animated Fictions in Maiden Castle", in In the Spirit of Powys: New Essays, ed. Denis Lane. (Cranbury, NJ: Associated University Presses, 1990), pp. 180–192.
- Nodius, Janina. "I Am Myself Alone": Solitude and Transcendence in John Cowper Powys. Goteborg, Sweden, University of Goteborg, 1997, pp. 135–170.

== See also ==
John Cowper Powys:

- Autobiography
- Owen Glendower
- Porius: A Romance of the Dark Ages
