= Porius: A Romance of the Dark Ages =

1951 novel by John Cowper Powys

- First edition
- Author: John Cowper Powys
- Language: English
- Genre: Historical romance
- Publisher: Macdonald & Company, London
- Publication date: 1951
- Publication place: United Kingdom
- Preceded by: Owen Glendower (1941)
- Followed by: The Inmates (1952)

Porius: A Romance of the Dark Ages is a 1951 historical romance by John Cowper Powys. Set in the Dark Ages during a week of autumn 499 AD, this novel is, in part, a bildungsroman, with the adventures of the eponymous protagonist Porius, heir to the throne of Edeyrnion, in North Wales, at its centre. The novel draws from both Arthurian legend and Welsh history and mythology, with Myrddin (Merlin) as another major character. The invasion of Wales by the Saxons and the rise of the new religion of Christianity are central themes. Due to the demands of publishers and a paper shortage in Britain, Powys was forced to excise more than 500 pages from the 1951 version. It wasn't until 2007 that the full novel, as Powys intended his magnum opus to be, was published both in Britain and America.

== Background ==
John Cowper Powys (1872–1963) initially established his literary reputation on the basis of four long novels, his Wessex novels. (Note: Powys was an admirer of Thomas Hardy and these novels are set in Somerset and Dorset part of Hardy's mythical Wessex. Richard Maxwell describes these four novels "as remarkably successful with the reading public of his time". "Two Canons: On the Meaning of Powys's Relation to Scott and his Turn to Historical Fiction", Western Humanities Review, vol. LVII, no. 1, Spring 2003, p. 103.) The last of these Maiden Castle was begun in Dorchester, Dorset, near where Hardy had lived, after Powys had returned from the USA, with his lover, Phyllis Playter, in 1934. However, in July, 1935 they moved to the village of Corwen, Denbighshire, North Wales, historically part of Edeirnion or Edeyrnion, an ancient commote of medieval Wales, where he completed Maiden Castle (1936). Edeirnion was nominally once a part of the Kingdom of Powys. This move to the land of his ancestors led Powys to writing the first of two historical novels set in this region of Wales, Owen Glendower, which was completed in 1939, published in the USA in 1941 and Britain in 1942. (Note: Issued 24 January 1941 in the USA and 6 February 1942 in the UK (not published in 1940 and 1941 as shown in the texts). Dante Thomas, A Bibliography of the Principal Writings of John Cowper Powys, unpublished Ph.D thesis (State University of New York at Albany, 1971), pp. 54–6.)

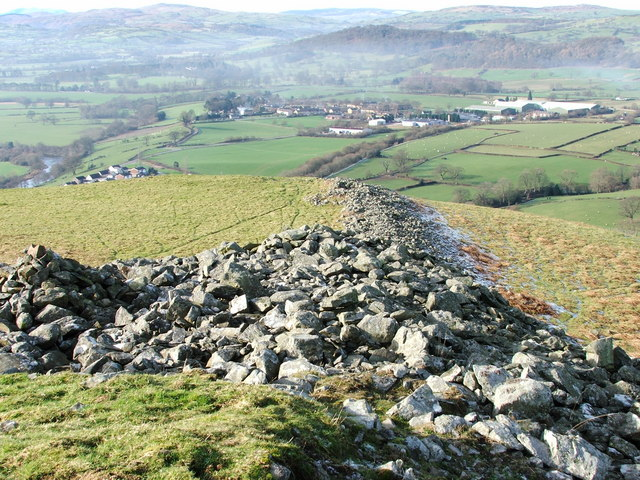
Caer Drewyn, Corwen, locally known as Mynydd-y-Gaer, the hill fort where Porius lives.

Then in 1940 he began a new novel set in contemporary Corwen but soon gave it up, to start his "Romance of Corwen", Porius, subtitled "a Romance of the Dark Ages" in January 1942. This, initially, was to have been about the Roman, stoic philosopher Boethius. However, Boethius never even appears and it was not completed until seven years later, in February, 1949. Between 1942 and 1951 Powys, however, published five non-fiction works: Mortal Strife (1942), The Art of Growing Old (1944), Dostoievsky (1946), Obstinate Cymric: Essays 1935–1947 (1947), and Rabelais (1948). Powys initially submitted Porius to Simon & Schuster his American publishers, publisher of all his previous major novels, from Wolf Solent (1929) to Owen Glendower (1941). But they rejected it as "indecypherable and overwritten". He had also sent a typescript to his English publisher, The Bodley Head. They, however, "refused to consider it, unless it was reduced by one third". This he did, reducing a typescript of 1589 pages to 999; however, Bodley Head made such "an insultingly small offer" that Powys rejected it. Finally Eric Harvey of Macdonald and Co. came to his rescue, but it was the abridged version that was published in 1951. More recently two new editions of Porius have been published in the attempt to reach Powys's original intention, with the use of the original manuscripts. The first, edited by Wilbur T. Albrecht, was published in 1994 by the Colgate University Press. This edition was, however, heavily criticized, and in 2007 Judith Bond and Morine Krissdóttir edited another version, published by Overlook Duckworth.

== Plot ==
The setting is the Kingdom of Edeyrnion in North Wales, where the indigenous Forest people have been ruled by the Brythonic Celts on behalf of Rome. Prince Einion, ruler of Edeyrnion, owes allegiance to the Emperor Arthur, who rules Britain for Rome. While historians tells us that Rome withdrew its army from Britain around 410 AD, Roman influence is still strong in Powys's late 5th century. But in the autumn of 499 AD the Saxons, under their leader Colgrim, are advancing on Edeyrnion and the Forest people have joined with them against their Brythonic rulers.

The main plot follows the various experiences of Porius, the heir to the throne of Edeyrnion, the novel's eponymous protagonist, and his struggle to gain freedom from the influence of his parents. This in particular involves resolving his divided loyalties between Rome and the indigenous peoples of Wales. Porius himself not only has Roman, Brythonic, ancestors but an ancestor who was an aboriginal giant as well as relatives amongst the Forest people. Porius gains maturity, and with it personal freedom, through a number of significant experiences, including especially this encounter with the aboriginal giants of Wales, as well as the profound influence of the magician, prophet, and possibly the god Chronos/Saturn, Myrddin, who reinforces the values, and develops on, the teachings of Porius's earlier teacher, the Christian heretic Pelagius. A major climax in the novel comes when Porius mates with the young giantess, he names Creiddylad, one of two surviving Cewri, or giants, the true aboriginals of Britain. This is immediately followed by the violent deaths of Creiddyladd and her father.

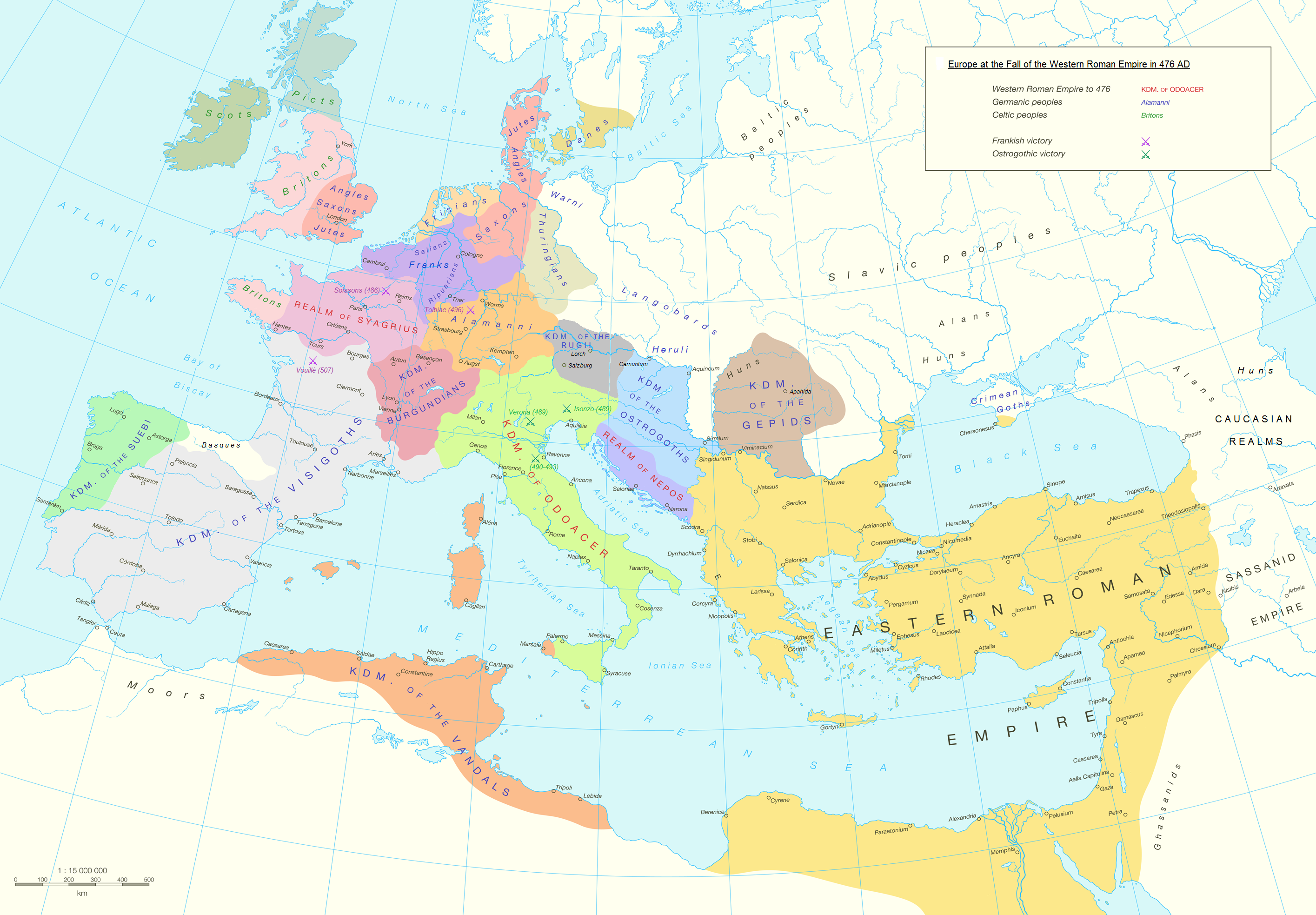
Europe in the late 5th century. Most names shown are the Latin names of 5th-century peoples, with the exceptions of Syagrius (king of a Gallo-Roman rump state), Odoacer (Germanic king of Italy), and (Julius) Nepos (nominally last Western Roman emperor, de facto ruler of Dalmatia).

However, this novel goes beyond Porius's experience, at times focusing on other characters. This includes the highly significant scene involving Myrddin's magical transformation of the owl Blodeuwedd into a young girl. Another important episode occurs when Morfydd, and Euronwy, Porius's mother, unite "to aid the endangered House of Cunedda". This involves Morfydd "sacrificing her love for Rhun" by agreeing to a political marriage with Porius, "in order to create harmony between the Roman and aboriginal peoples". Then there is the scene which involves Brochvael, Morfydd's scholarly father, who represents classical Roman culture, confronting the aboriginal worlds of Sibylla and the Druids, which dramatizes the novel's central political conflict in yet another way.

The novel's final climax comes with Porius's "rescue" of Myrddin from his entombment by the enchantress Nineue on the summit of Snowdon, Wales' highest mountain. A scene where, according to Powys scholar C. A. Coates, Porius saves "the good magician" by resisting "the temptation of the bad fairy". However, the ending is ambiguous, and "Merlin's stature at the end of the novel is such to preclude any sense that his is not in fact the ultimate power". Powys provides invaluable commentary on Nineue in his "The Characters of the Book". However, by freeing Myrddin Porius makes possible Myrddin's return in two thousand years to re-establish the Saturnian Age of Gold.

At the end of the novel Ederynion remains free from Saxon domination, a freedom that it will retain and which will shape the subsequent history of the Welsh: "The new nation, the Cymry, is to be born as a result of the Saxon invasion". And Porius himself has also gained the necessary personal freedom and maturity he that will need as the future ruler of Edeyrnion.

== Characters ==
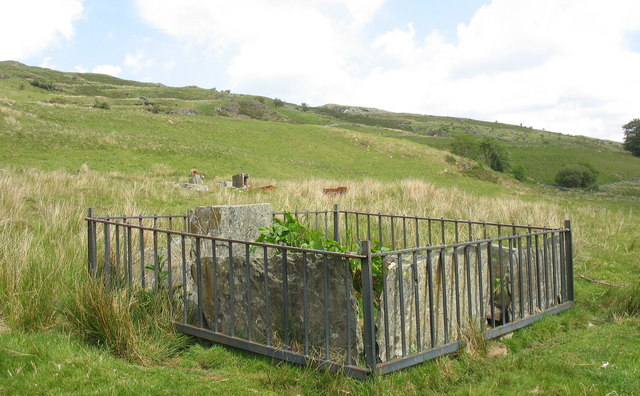
The Porius Stone, Trawsfynydd. This is a duplicate and the original is in the National Museum of Wales, in Cardiff.

- Porius is the thirty-year-old son of Prince Einion and Princess Euronwy and the hero of this historical romance. Poet and literary critic Jeremy Hooker draws attention to the similarity between the names Porius and Powys. Powys has taken Porius's name from a Latin inscription on a stone found near Trawsfynydd, Gwynedd, Wales, which he describes in a letter to his sister Philippa of 24 December [1947], as "the only authentic Historical Document of the Date", i.e. 499 AD. The Porius Stone reads: Porius hic in tumuli iacet Homo Christianus fuit, “Porius here lies buried. He was a Christian man”. Porius has the blood of the ancient aboriginal giants, the Cewri in his veins from his great-grandmother Creiddylad, and he is frequently compared, in the novel, to the Greek hero Hercules, the Roman name for the Greek divine hero Heracles. His physical strength and giant ancestry is demonstrated when "our Brythonic Hercules" picks up a "dead man by the heels" and uses the body as a weapon to drive off twenty Saxons.
- Myrddin Wyllt or Merlin the Wild, is the Emperor Arthur's counsellor. A legendary figure associated, in some sources, with events in the 6th century, Myrddin is a figure in medieval Welsh legend, known as a prophet and a madman. He is the most important prototype for the modern composite image of Merlin, the magician of Arthurian legend. Powys identifies him with Cronos or Saturn the father of Zeus.
- Nineue ferch Avalach (Nineue daughter of Afallach) is Tennyson's Vivien. Tennyson used the name "Vivien" for the Lady of the Lake in his Idylls of the King (1859). In Welsh mythology, Modron ("divine mother") was a daughter of Avallach, derived from the Gaulish goddess Matrona. She may have been the prototype of Morgan le Fay from Arthurian legend. She was the mother of Mabon, who bears her name as "Mabon ap Modron" ("Mabon, Son of Modron"), and who was stolen away from her when he was three days-old and later rescued by King Arthur. Powys has an invaluable discussion of Nineue in his "The Characters of the Book".
- Prince Einion, father of Porius and reigning Prince of the Edeyrnion and great-great grandson of the legendary Cunedda.
- Euronwy is Porius's mother, cousin of the Emperor Arthur, and daughter of Porius Manlius, a Roman.
- Brochvael, the brother of Prince Einion, is used by Powys to anchor the novel in the real world of the late 5th-century, because he is associated with a number of historical figures. For example, he had encountered in Rome "the precocious boy Boethius"; the philosopher lived from c. 480–524 or 525 AD. He also corresponded with the Roman statesman and writer Cassiodorus (c. 485 – c. 585), who served in the administration of Theoderic the Great, King of the Ostrogoths. Brochvael had in addition been a friend of Apollinaris Sidonius (circa 430 – August 489 A. D.), a poet, diplomat, and bishop. Sidonius has been described as "the single most important surviving author from fifth-century Gaul" by Eric Goldberg. He was one of four 5th- to 6th-century Gallo-Roman aristocrats whose letters survive in quantity. Brochvael also owns a manuscript of the Comedies of the Greek dramatist Aristophanes.

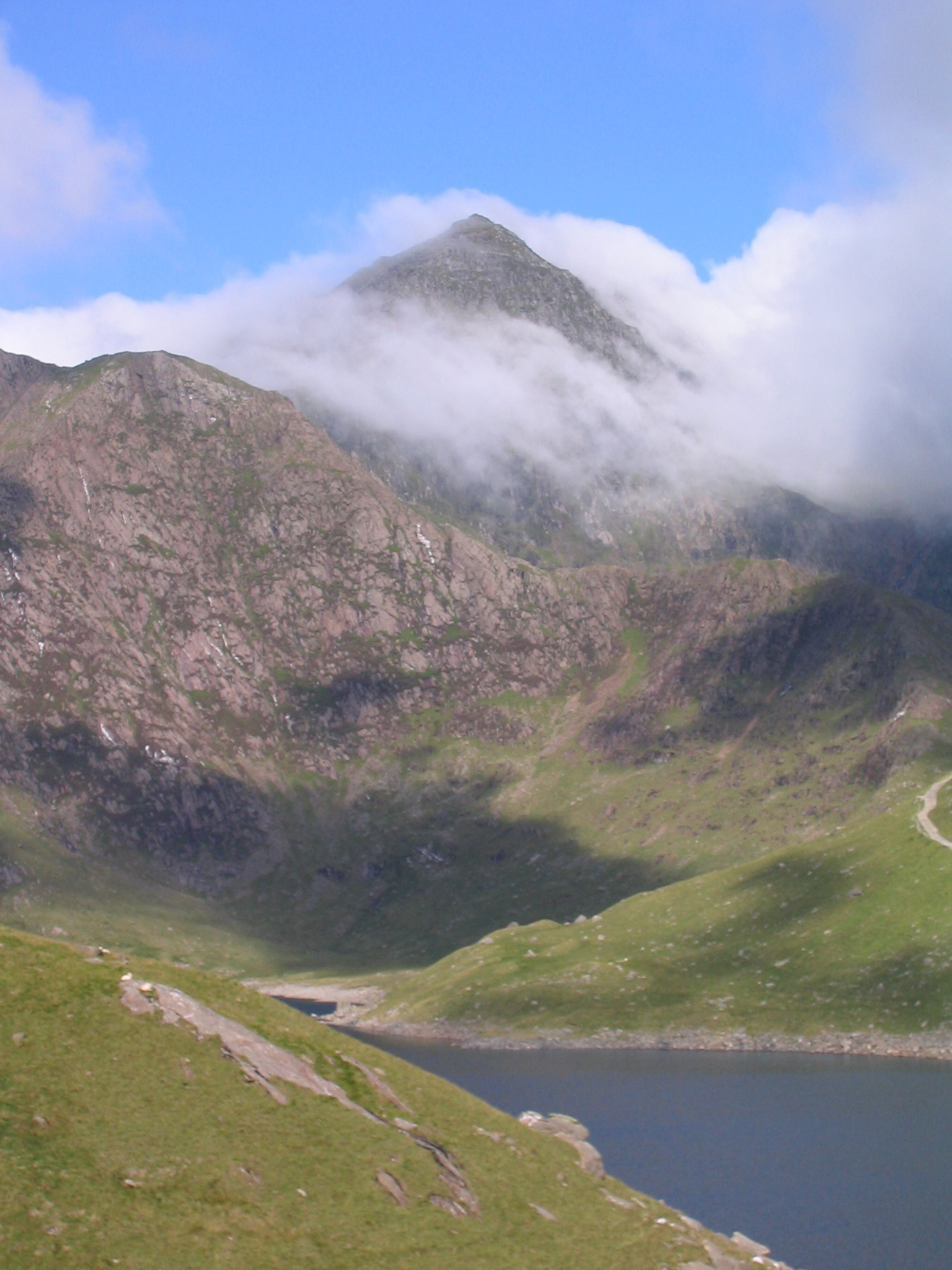
Snowdon, Gwynedd, the highest mountain in Wales. The name Snowdon is from the Old English for "snow hill", while the Welsh name – Yr Wyddfa – means "the tumulus", which may refer to the cairn thrown over the legendary giant Rhitta Gawr after his defeat by King Arthur. As well as other figures from Arthurian legend, the mountain is linked to a legendary afanc (water monster) and the Tylwyth Teg (fairies).

- Morfydd is the daughter of Brochvael, and both cousin and future wife of Porius.
- Rhun is Porius's cousin and foster brother. He is a worshipper of Mithras, a mystery religion practiced in the Roman Empire from about the 1st to 4th centuries AD. His father was Greek.
- Taliessin is the poet, known as Pen Beirdd Ynys Prydein or Head Bard of the Isles of Britain. Powys compares him to American poet Walt Whitman. Scholars have suggested that there are essentially two Taliessin's: one a professional court poet from the 6th century and the other a mythological figure "associated with other mythological figures, with folklore, and with the idea of “metaphysical, transformational” poetry". The first "a professional poet serving the courts of Welsh princes in the North during the latter part of the sixth century". This Taliesin is briefly mentioned in Historia Regum Britanniae, attributed to Nennius a Welsh monk of the 9th century. The first "historical" Taliesin and Aneirin are to only two early Welsh poets whose work has survived. An important manuscript The Book of Taliesin, or Llyfr Taliesin, contains about sixty Welsh poems, of which twelve are ascribed to the “historical,” Taliesin, a bard, who created praise poems for Urien Rheged and his son Owain ab Urien. There are another fifteen poems which are associated with the "legendary" Taliesin; these texts refer to a wide-ranging time trans-shifting shape-shifting all-knowing mythological being, who is described as both timeless and eternal. Another important Taliesin text is the Ystoria Taliesin, Hanes Taliesin, which contains Welsh prose and poetry, about and, claiming to be, by Taliessin. Taliessin is also mentioned in Welsh triads, and in the beginning of Culhwch and Olwen.
- The Henog: Powys created Sylvannus Bleheris, Henog of Dyfed, author of the Four Pre-Arthurian Branches of the Mabinogi concerned with Pryderi, as a way linking the mythological background of Porius with this aspect of the Mabinogion.
- Amherawdr (Emperor) Arthur the Brythonic ruler of Britain is only a minor character in Porius. Arthur is a legendary British leader of the late 5th and early 6th centuries, who, according to medieval histories and romances, led the defense of Britain against Saxon invaders in the early 6th century. The details of Arthur's story are mainly composed of folklore and literary invention, and his historical existence is debated and disputed by modern historians. The sparse historical background of Arthur is gleaned from various sources, including the Annales Cambriae, the Historia Brittonum, and the writings of Gildas. Arthur's name also occurs in early poetic sources such as Y Gododdin. In a letter to his sister Philippa Powys, dated 18 February 1943, Powys describes "going on with my 'Dark Ages' Romance ... round the year 500 A.D. the date of Arthur's victory at Mons Badonicus".
- Gogfran Derwydd, the Druid of the Forest People, who is described by Powys as possessing "an extremely cynical, detached and scientific mind", and as being a practitioner of both black and white magic. A druid was a member of the priestly class among the Celtic peoples of Gaul, Britain, Ireland, and possibly elsewhere during the Iron Age.
- Cewri or aboriginal giants. In the Mabinogi of Branwen ferch Llyr, Britain is ruled by the giant Bran the Blessed, who has never been able to fit inside any dwelling. In Culhwch and Olwen (a Welsh tale about a hero connected with Arthur and his warriors), giants feature as antagonists throughout. Ysbaddaden, chief of giants, is the father of Olwen, a beautiful maiden sought by Culhwch fab Cilydd, a cousin of King Arthur's. He is slain at the tale's close by his nephew Goreu fab Custennin, while Wrnach, another giant, is killed by Cei. The last two survivors of these original inhabitants of Britain die in the novel. Their legendary ruler Rhitta Gawr is buried in the hill fort, Mynydd-y-Gaer, where Porius lives. The Cewri are seen as living on the mountain Cader Idris; this translates as the chair of Idris (who was a giant). See also Creiddylad.
- Creiddylad was Porius's giantess great-grandmother and the name that he invents for the young Cawres with whom he mates. In Arthurian literature Creiddylad is the daughter of Lludd Silver Hand, a lady living at the court of King Arthur. She is considered to be the most beautiful girl in the British Isles, and is loved by two of Arthur's warriors: Gwythyr and Gwyn. Powys is also aware of the idea that Creiddylad can be identified with Queen Cordelia, a legendary Queen of the Britons, as recounted by Geoffrey of Monmouth. She was the youngest daughter of Leir, Shakespeare's King Lear. Cordelia is the name of Owen Evans' wife in A Glastonbury Romance.
- For more information on the above, as well as details for other characters, see:
  - John Cowper Powys, " 'Preface' or anything you like to Porius". The Powys Newsletter 4, 1974–5, pp. 7–13.
  - ________________, "The Characters of the Book”. The Powys Newsletter 4, 1974–5, pp. 14–21.
  - W. J. Keith, John Cowper Powys: 'Porius', A Reader's Companion:

== Romance ==
It is not surprising that Powys describes Porius as a romance, because it draws heavily on Arthurian romance as well as the Welsh classic the Mabinogion, parts of which contain Arthurian stories; furthermore it includes both giants and magic. (Note: "Jerome McGann notes that "Powys was learned in Arthurian romance". "Marvels and Wonders: Powys, Porius and the attempt to revive romance in the age of modernism". Times Literary Supplement, December 1, 1995, p. 5.) However, Myrddin Wyllt (Merlin), and Nineue, the Lady of the Lake are the major Arthurian characters and King Arthur only has a minor role. There are other Arthurian figures, including Medrawd (Mordred or Modred), Galahaut, and Powys also makes use of the Arthurian name Creiddylad. Creiddylad in the novel is Porius's giantess great-grandmother and as well it is the name Porius gives to the young giantess that he encounters. In Arthurian literature Creiddylad is the daughter of Lludd Silver Hand, a lady living at the court of King Arthur. She is considered to be the most beautiful girl in the British Isles, and is loved by two of Arthur's warriors: Gwythyr and Gwyn. Other characters include Taliessin, based on the possibly mythic Welsh poet of that name and the Henog, Powys's fictional author of the Mabinogion. The novel's eponymous protagonist Porius, is the son of Prince Einion, "reigning Prince of Edeyrnion [who is the] great-great-grandson of Cunedda", a Welsh king who lived in the 5th century AD. (Note: Powys is writing a work of fiction and plays freely with dates. John Cowper Powys, "The Characters of the Novel". Porius (2007), p. 19.)

== Themes ==
Porius is a bildungsroman concerned with "the sentimental education of" Porius, and early in the novel we learn that Porius has reached "the first great turning point of his life". Porius's education includes a wide variety of experience, but his encounters with Myrddin, Nineue, and the giantess Creiddylad have the profoundest influence on him. Yet Michael Ballin of Wilfrid Laurier University, comments that "The structural and thematic unity of the novel is obscured […] if we read it as mainly being the personal biography of its protagonist". American Powys scholar Denis Lane goes as far as to suggest that there are "no less than half a dozen spokesmen" in Porius, and names Myrddin, Brochvael, Morfydd, Taliessin, and Einion, in addition to its eponymous hero. This polyphony of voices creates an "intricate work" with "a welter of accessory action, little of which is trivial or unimportant" and its "loose narrative forms" are unified "when viewed in relation to the novel's theme". C. A. Coates also notes, in John Cowper Powys in Search of a Landscape that "The novel contains more Powys-personae than any other", and adds Cadawg and the dead Pelagius to the list.

What is important to these Powysian personae, and which provides one of the central organizing theme of Porius, is "the pluralist sensationalism that Powys has been attempting to describe for so long", Powys's "elementalism", what Porius calls cavoseniargizing. American literary critic Denis Lane claims, that

Powys filled his "Romance of the Dark Ages", with a sense of elementalism far surpassing that of other novels. Every aspect of the novel is drawn with reference to the elemental world – human thought, speech, action, contemplation, are all viewed as coordinative with other parts of nature.

Canadian literary scholar John Brebner, in his essay "The Anarchy of the Imagination", also concludes that "Porius is in many ways Powys's most comprehensive and successful statement of his life-vision".

Equally important as Powys's concern with elementalism is his concern with individual freedom: "The central issue is the autonomy of individual human choice and vision over every creed and pressure from without", Its "central message [is] voluntarism, [a concern with] the creative power of the imagination and [how] the human will [determines] the course of our evolution in the face of political and religious tyrannies". Powys's "emphasis is upon individual rights [...] that permit a plurality of choice independent of moralistic constraints," and "the sanctity of the individual imagination". Associated with these themes is Powys's favourable presentation of the ideas of the Christian heretic Pelagius, and his belief in free will and rejection of original sin, and the implied condemnation of Christianity's subsequent development into "an authoritarian system".

=== Race and religion ===
Powys's presentation of Britain in 499 AD as a multi-racial society provides him with the opportunity to comment on themes related to the rise of totalitarian regimes and racial nationalism in the 20th century. The period he represents is one in which "[t]he racial mingling throws up a froth of religious and philosophical controversy". Michael Ballin calls Porius "both a diagnosis and a criticism of Western contemporary culture." Among the different ethnic groups are the Romans, the Forest People (the "true Welsh aboriginals", a non-Aryan race which originated in Africa), the Gwyddylaid (Goidels or Irish Celts), Ffichti (Picts), Gwyddyl Ffichti, Brythons (or British), and the Cewri (aboriginal giants). Both the Gwyddylaid and Brythons are Celts. In addition there are individuals from further races, including a Jewish family, Rhun's Greek father, while it is suggested that Myrddin may have come from Atlantis, or be the last of the Coranians. Several Saxon characters also represent Britain's latest conquerors. Porius himself has ancestors who were Romans, Brythons, Cewri or giants, and the Forest people, and the novel highlights how the multi-cultural nature of Britain, and the varied religious beliefs of different ethnic groups, is shaping history. Amongst the beliefs existing in 5th-century Wales are Christianity, the Pelagian heresy, Mithraism, Pythagorism, Druidism, and Judaism. As well Porius is concerned with the idea of possible alternative histories that might have arisen from this significant transitional age, if a different religion than Christianity (or different version of Christianity) had triumphed. In Mortal Strife, his wartime propaganda work of 1942, Powys suggests that the multi-racial mixture of contemporary Britains will help in the fight against the more racially pure Germans.

In 499 AD, various ethnic cultures and their differing religious beliefs are involved in a conflict from which Christianity will eventually triumph. At this time, however, even within Christianity there is the conflict between the doctrines of Augustine of Hippo, along whose theological lines it subsequently developed, and the competing heresy of Pelagianism, to which this novel's protagonist is an adherent: "Porius owes to Pelagius the imaginative impulse that liberates him by allowing him to use his imagination to create the future through the soul's inmost desire". In Porius Powys suggests, through the protagonist's Pelagianism, an alternative to the authoritarian direction that, he believes, Christianity actually took. Furthermore Porius soon after the novel opens comes under the influence of Myrddin: "a living, almost divine embodiment of the teaching of […] Pelagius." At the end of the first half of the 20th century Powys was witnessing the demise of Christianity and the rise of the new religions of the 20th century.

=== Porius and the 20th century ===
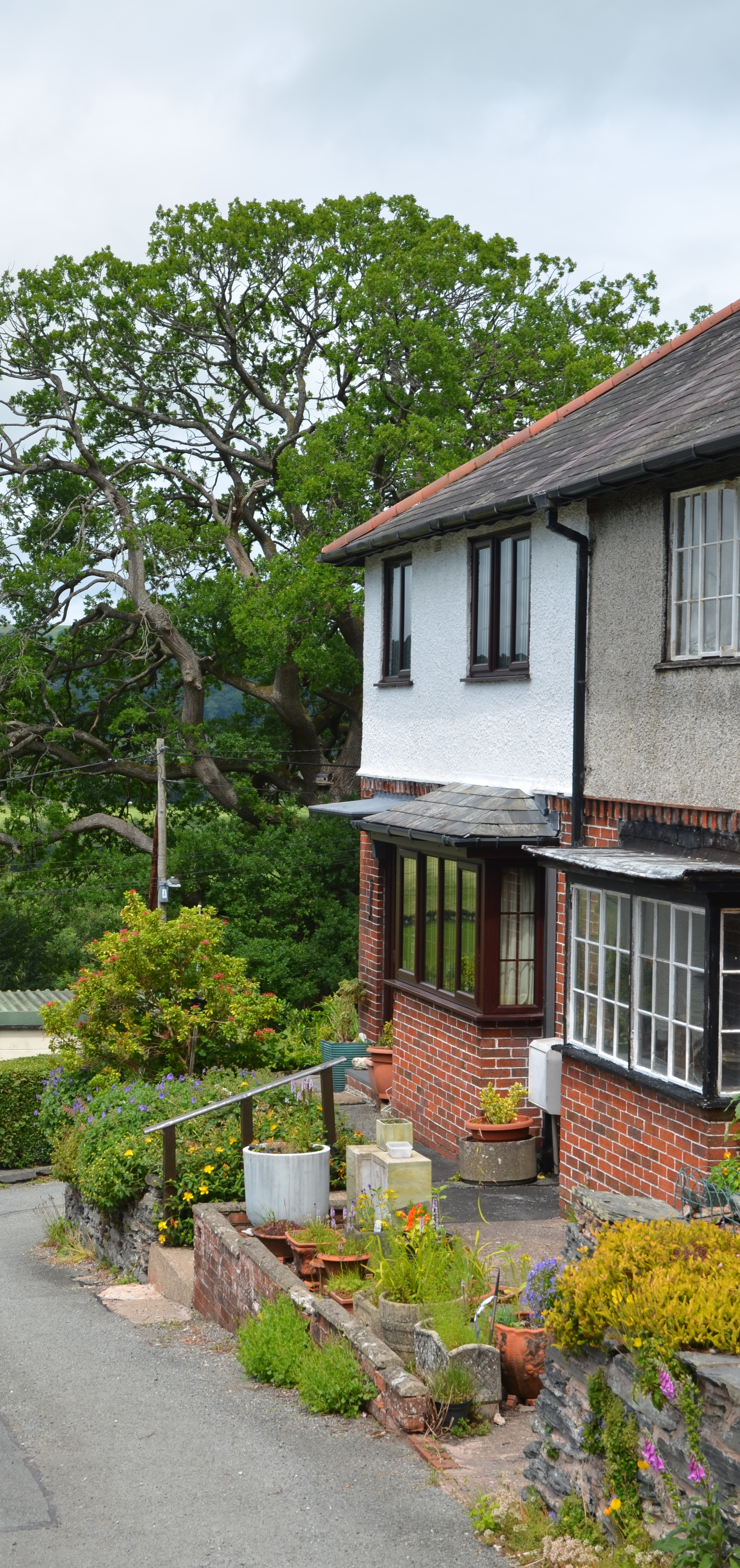
7 Cae Coed, Corwen, Denbighshire, Powys's home during the years in which he wrote Porius

Porius takes place during the week of "October 18, to October 25, A.D. 499", a time Powys claims when "There appears to be an absolute blank, as far as documentary evidence goes, with regard to the history of Britain". Making a claim similar to that of other historians and historical novelists who try to historicize the Arthurian legend, Powys suggests that it is "therefore highly probable" that King Arthur ruled at the time of this "historic blank". This is a time when Roman influence was still strong in Britain, although the Roman army left in 410 AD and the Saxons had established settlements in England. Powys deliberate chose a point of major transition in the history of Britain, with on the one hand the replacing of Roman traditions with Saxon rule, along with the coming of Christianity. There are parallels with contemporary history: "The Dark Ages and the 1930s are the periods of what Powys, in Yeatsian phrase calls 'appalling transition' ". There was the clear possibility of another "Saxon" invasion when Powys began writing Porius in 1942. In prefatory comments, probably written around 1949, at the time of the beginning of the Cold War, Powys suggests that,

As we contemplate the historic background to ... the last year of the fifth century [sic], it is impossible not to think of the background of human life from which we watch the first half of the twentieth century dissolve into the second half. As the old gods were departing then, so the old gods are departing now. And as the future was dark with the terrifying possibilities of human disaster then, so, today, are we confronted by the possibility of catastrophic world events.

Powys makes a similar comment in the "Argument" to Owen Glendower: "the period that formed the immediate background to […] this tale—1400–1416—saw the beginning of one of the most momentous and startling epochs of transition that the world has known". Michael Ballin discusses how, in Porius, "the present is perceived through the spectacles of the past". Likewise distinguished American literary scholar Jerome McGann, in his Times Literary Supplement review article "Marvels and wonders", describes the novel, as "a profound meditation on the twentieth century's abiding social sickness, and on fascism in particular, their emblematic form".

== Critical reputation ==
Some admirers of Powys have problems with Porius. Literary critic G. Wilson Knight, in his study of John Cowper Powys, The Saturnian Quest (1964), finds that "the detailed historical knowledge is so dense that it clogs the action" and sees a problem in the way the reader expects "historical excitement where the author has no intention of providing them". For Harald Fawkner, a prolific writer on Powys from the Stockholm University, Sweden, although Powys is "one of the great mystic writers of all time", the "occult passages in Porius are more often inadvertent parodies of their counterparts in the major romances [...] they are no more mystical (and no more interesting) than an electrical bill".

Charles Lock of the University of Copenhagen, Denmark, has a different opinion of the newly restored novel of 1995, which he describes as "one of the supreme works of twentieth-century literature". Editors Morine Krissdóttir and Judith Bond, in their "Foreword" to Porius, comment that in fifty years "readers who have been initiated into the wonders and marvels of magic realism will be in a better position to recognize […] Porius as a modern masterpiece".

== See also ==
John Cowper Powys:

- Autobiography
- A Glastonbury Romance
- Maiden Castle
- Weymouth Sands
- Wolf Solent

== Select bibliography ==
- Ballin, Michael. "John Cowper Powys's Porius and the Dialectic of History".The Powys Review 19, 1986, pp. 20–35.
- _______ . "Porius and the Cauldron of Rebirth", in In the Spirit of Powys: New Essays, ed. Alan Lane. Cranbury, NJ: Associated Universities Press, 1990, pp. 214–35.
- _______ ."Porius and the Feminine", Powys Notes, vol.6:2, Fall, 1990, pp. 4–20.
- Birns, Nicholas, "Awe-Inspiring Hideousness: Porius, by John Cowper Powys". Hyperion: On the Future of Aesthetics, Volume V, issue 2, November 2010.
- Charles-Edwards, Thomas M. (1991), "The Arthur of History", in Bromwich, Rachel; Jarman, A. O. H.; Roberts, Brynley F. (eds.), The Arthur of the Welsh, Cardiff: University of Wales Press, pp. 15–32, ISBN 978-0-7083-1107-3.
- Duncan, Ian. "Sacred monsters: re-reading Porius." Powys Journal, 19, 2009, pp. 161–8.
- Higham, N. J. (2002), King Arthur, Myth-Making and History, London: Routledge, ISBN 978-0-415-21305-9.
- Krissdóttir, Morine. Descents of Memory. New York: Overlook Duckworth, 2007. The most comprehensive biography.
- Lane, Denis. "Elementalism in John Cowper Powys' Porius. Papers on Language and Literature 17, no. 4 (1981), pp. 381–404.
- McGann, Jerome."Marvels and wonders: Powys, Porius and the attempt to revive romance in the age of modernism". Times Literary Supplement, December 1, 1995, pp. 4–6.
- _______ . "Impossible Fiction; or, The Importance of Being John Cowper Powys" in The Scholar's Art. Chicago: University of Chicago Press, 2006, pp. 175–89.
- Maxwell, Richard, ed. "A Symposium on the new Colgate Porius. Powys Notes, vol.10, no.1, Fall and Winter 1995, pp. 4–55
- _______ , ed. Powys Notes, vol. 7:2, Fall and Winter 1992. A Porius edition.
- _______ . "A Game of Yes and No: Childhood and Apocalypse in Porius'", Powys Journal 16, 2006, pp. 84–102
- _______ . "Two Canons: On the Meaning of Powys's Relation to Scott and His Turn to Historical Fiction". Western Humanities Review, 57:1, Spring 2003, pp. 103–110.
- Powys, John Cowper. " 'Preface' or anything you like to Porius"; "The Characters of the Book”. The Powys Newsletter 4, 1974–5, pp. 7–21.
- _______ . Porius: A Romance of the Dark Ages. London: Macdonald, 1951.
- _______ . Porius: A Romance of the Dark Ages, ed. Wilbur T. Albrecht. Hamilton, NY: Colgate University Press, 1994.
- _______ . Porius, ed. Judith Bond and Morine Krissdóttir. New York: Overlook Duckworth, 2007.
- Sims-Williams, Patrick (1991), "The Early Welsh Arthurian Poems", in Bromwich, Rachel; Jarman, A. O. H.; Roberts, Brynley F. (eds.), The Arthur of the Welsh, Cardiff: University of Wales Press, pp. 33–71, ISBN 978-0-7083-1107-3.
