= Weymouth Sands =

1934 novel by John Cowper Powys

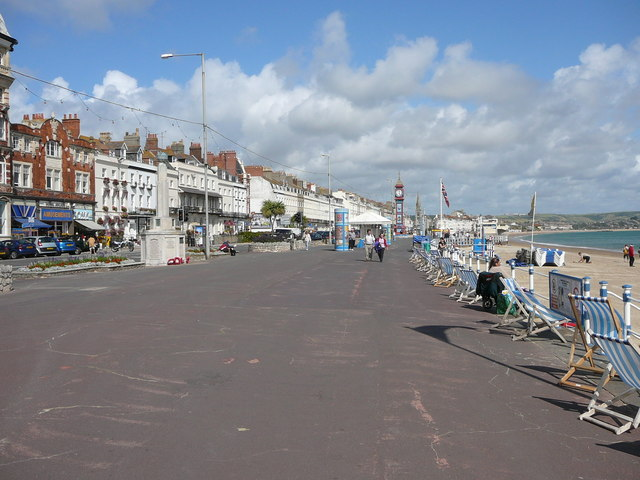
- Weymouth seafront
- Author: John Cowper Powys
- Language: English
- Genre: Novel
- Published: 1934 US; 1936 UK as Jobber Skald
- Publisher: Simon & Schuster
- Media type: Print
- Preceded by: A Glastonbury Romance (1932)
- Followed by: Autobiography (1934); Maiden Castle (1936)

Weymouth Sands is a novel by John Cowper Powys, which was written in rural upper New York State and published in February 1934 in New York City by Simon and Schuster. It was published in Britain as Jobber Skald in 1935 by John Lane. Weymouth Sands was the third of John Cowper Powys's so-called Wessex novels, which include Wolf Solent (1929), A Glastonbury Romance (1932), and Maiden Castle (1936). Powys was an admirer of novelist and poet Thomas Hardy, and these novels are set in Somerset and Dorset, part of Hardy's mythical Wessex. American scholar Richard Maxwell describes these four novels "as remarkably successful with the reading public of his time".

The setting of this novel is the English seaside town of Weymouth, Dorset, and according to Samuel Levenson: "There are nineteen main characters, ... forty or more minor ones; ... a dozen main plots and as many minor ones, and "the author takes us into every street and alley in Weymouth".

== Background ==
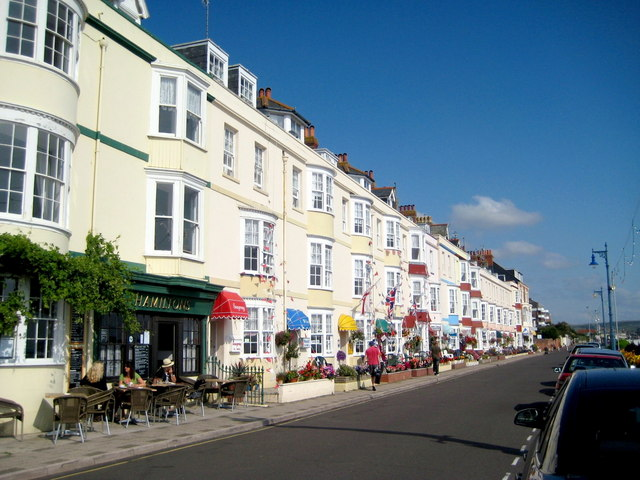
Brunswick Terrace, Weymouth, Dorset. Powys's paternal grandmother lived in Penn House, 21 Brunswick Terrace

Powys's paternal grandmother lived in Weymouth, and when his father became a curate in nearby Dorchester, the family took temporary lodgings behind Brunswick Terrace, where she lived in 1879. Weymouth remained throughout Powys's life the place where he was most at home and "[a]lways in [his] memory was the pebbled seashore opposite Brunswick Terrace". C.A. Coates in her book on Powys notes the importance of Weymouth for his imagination, quoting from Autobiography: "every aspect of the Weymouth Coast sank into my mind with such a transubstantiating magic" that "it is through the medium of these things that I envisage all the experiences of my life". When he died in 1963 Powys's ashes were scattered on nearby Chesil Beach. Powys notes in his Diary on Valentine's Day 1932 that "I'm really going to begin my Weymouth Book" and he also records that he had been given "Hardy's Well-Beloved by his lover Phyllis Playter, a novel which is set in on the Isle of Portland where Jobber Skald, the protagonist of Weymouth Sands, comes from.

Weymouth Sands is the title of the American first edition and an English edition then appeared in 1935, but prior to its publication Powys and his English publishers were successfully sued for libel by Gerard Hodgkinson, who claimed that the character of Philip Crow in A Glastonbury Romance had been based on him. The damages awarded crippled Powys financially, and he was forced to make substantial changes to the British edition of Weymouth Sands. The title of the English version was changed to Jobber Skald (1935) and all references to the real-life Weymouth were cut. The date of the action was also changed from "The present" to "190-".

Phyllis Playter, Powys' companion since the early 1920s, played a major role in the writing of Weymouth Sands. In fact Powys believed "she ought to have her name on this book'". To provide one example: "And now she has thought out a wonderful idea for my book – about making Sylvanus Cobbold into a revivalistic preacher with a little idiot or sub-normal girl-friend & he to be Put away.

Here, amongst other things "Powys tells the story of Jobber Skald - a large, somewhat brutish man, obsessed with the urge to kill the local magnate of the town because of the man's contempt for the workers of the local quarry - and his redeeming love for Perdita Wane, a young girl from the Channel Islands". Other important characters are "a striking collection of human oddities including a famous clown, his mad brother, a naive Latin teacher, a young philosopher, and an abortionist."

Novelist Margaret Drabble comments, "Weymouth Sands is a celebration of the seaside town [Powys] had loved as a child, but its tone is far from innocent. The novel features a sinister clown figure and Punch and Judy shows: Powys was not one to shy away from the suggestions of violence and child sex abuse that are now routinely associated with such entertainments."

== Critical reception ==
Philosopher John Gray comments that

In Wolf Solent and Weymouth Sands, perhaps the most accomplished of the Wessex series of novels that includes the panoramic Glastonbury Romance, Powys evokes the floating world of moment-to-moment awareness as found in a collection of characters living on the edges of society, struggling to fashion a life in which their contradictory impulses could somehow be reconciled. The fusion of introspective analysis with an animistic sense of the elemental background of human life which he achieves in these books is unique in European literature.

== Bibliography ==
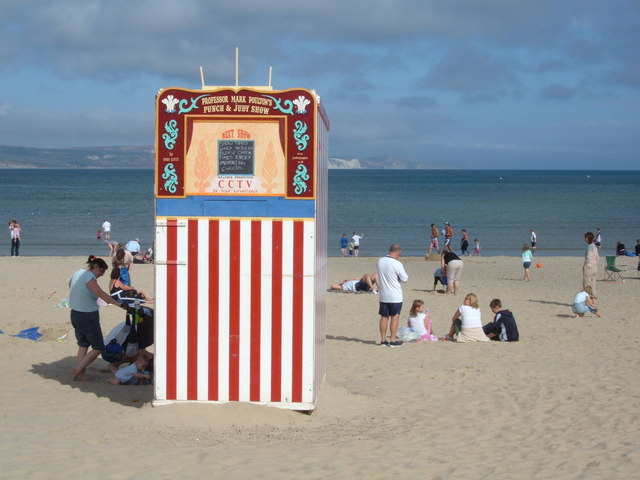
Punch and Judy, Weymouth Beach

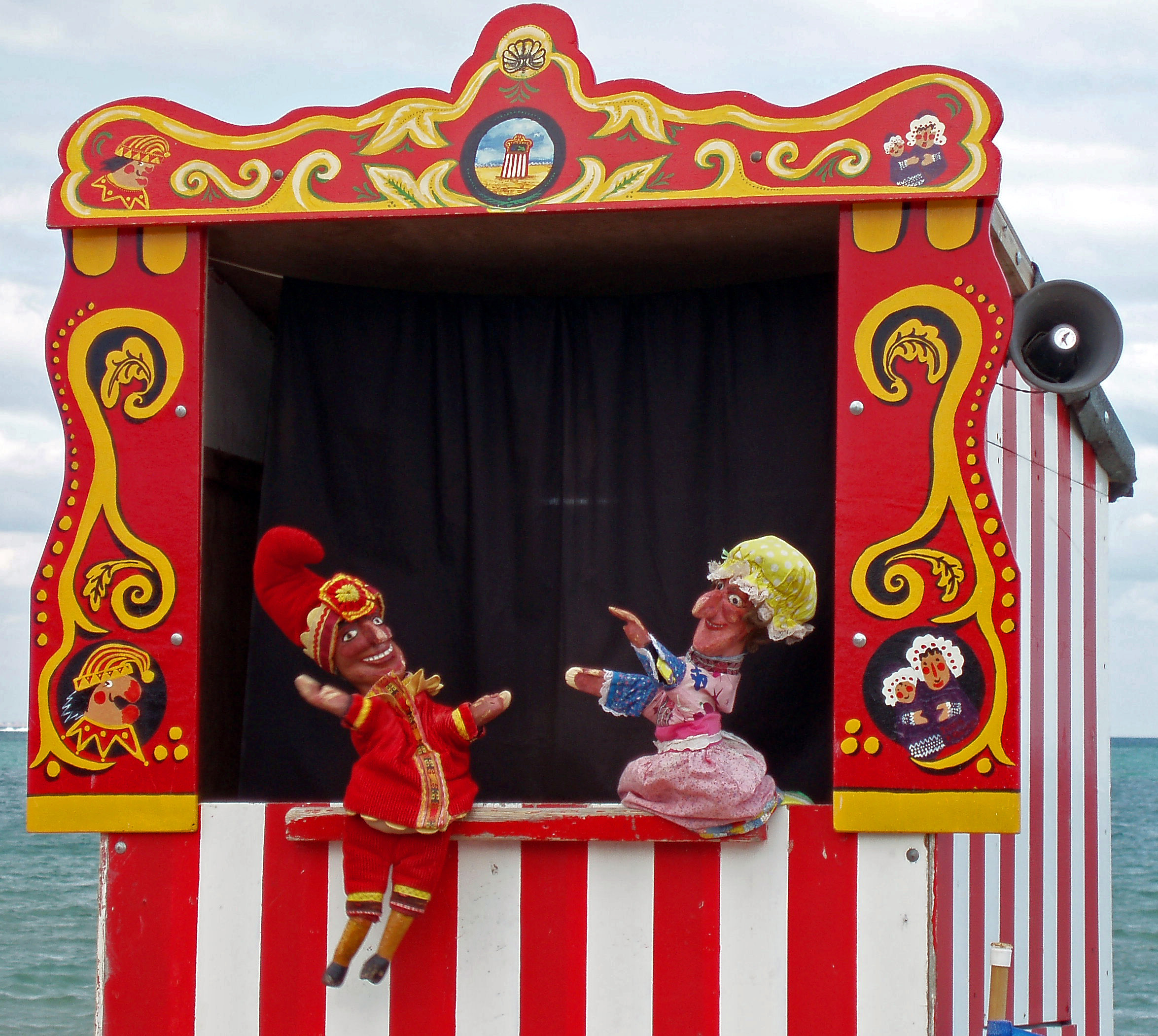
A traditional Punch and Judy booth, at Swanage, Dorset, England

=== Editions ===
- Weymouth Sands: A Novel. New York: Simon & Schuster, 1934
  - 2nd impression, N.Y.
  - Jobber Skald, John Lane: London,1935
- London: Macdonald, 1963
- New York: Harper & Row, 1984, Introduction by James Purdy ISBN 0-06-091164-6
- Cambridge: Rivers Press, 1973 Introduction by Angus Wilson ISBN 0-903747-04-9;
- London: Writers and Readers Publishing Cooperative, 1979 ISBN 0-906495-20-2
- London : Pan Books (Mcmillan), 1980 ISBN 0-330-26050-2
- Woodstock, NY: Overlook Press, 1999 ISBN 978-0-87951-706-9
- London: Penguin, 2000 ISBN 0-14-028647-0
- London: Duckworth, 2009
- Kindle version: Valmy Publishing, 2018 The Powys Society, 2019

==== Translations ====
- In French Les Sables de la mer, translated Marie Canavaggia, with introduction by Jean Wahl. Paris: Plon, 1958 ISBN 978-3-86150-422-1; Les Sables de Weymouth, translated Jacqueline Peltier, with introduction by Goulven Le Brech. Rennes : Les Perséides, 2024 ISBN 978-2-37125-077-2
- In German Der Strand von Weymouth, translated by Melanie Walz. Munich:Carl Hanser Verlag, 1999 ISBN 3-446-19776-1

=== Critical studies ===
- Collins, H. P., "The Sands Do Not Run Out", in Essays on John Cowper Powys, edited Belinda Humfrey. Cardiff: University of Wales Press, 1972, pp. 206–18.
- Humfrey, Belinda, ed.The Powys Review. Index to critical articles and other material:
- Krissdottir, Morine. Descents of Memory: The Life of John Cowper Powys. New York: Overlook Duckworth, 2007, pp. 273–81.
- Low, Anthony, "Dry Sand and Wet Sand: Margins and Thresholds in Weymouth Sands", in In the Spirit of Powys: New essays. Cranbury, NJ: Associated University Presses, 1990, pp. 112–135.
- Peltier, Jacqueline, ed. la lettre powysienne. Index to critical articles and other material: .

== See also ==
- Powys, John Cowper, Owen Glendower
- Powys, John Cowper, Porius: A Romance of the Dark Ages
