= John Cowper Powys's Autobiography =

1934 book by John Cowper Powys

Autobiography
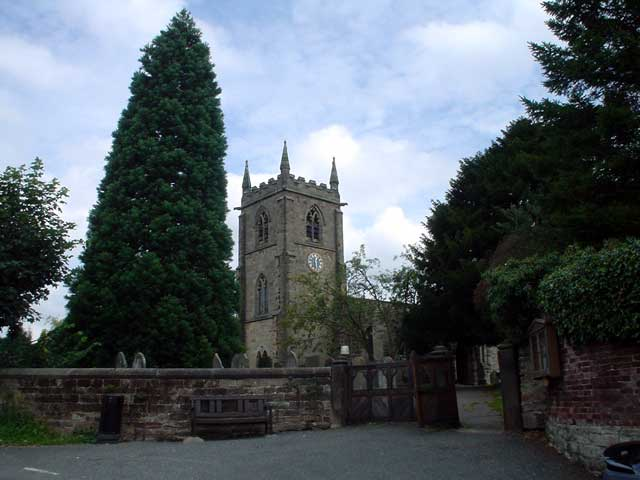
- Shirley Church, Derbyshire. The church where Powys's father was the vicar, in the village where Powys was born on 8 October 1872.
- Author: John Cowper Powys
- Language: English
- Genre: Autobiography
- Publisher: Simon & Schuster
- Publication date: 1934
- Publication place: England
- Pages: 600
- Preceded by: A Glastonbury Romance
- Followed by: Weymouth Sands

John Cowper Powys's (1872–1963) Autobiography, published in 1934, the year Powys returned to Britain from America, describes his first 60 years, and is considered one of his most important works.

== Overview ==
Writer J. B. Priestley comments: "Even if Powys had never written any novels – and at least one of them, A Glastonbury Romance is a masterpiece – this one book alone would have proved him to be a writer of genius." While he sets out to be frank about himself, and especially his sexual peculiarities and perversions, he largely excludes any substantial discussion of the women in his life. It has become clear that the reason for this is because it was written while he was still married to Margaret Lyon though he was living in a permanent relationship with the American Phyllis Playter. Morine Krissdotir, in The Life of Powys, describes the first chapter of the Autobiography as "one of the most complex and beautifully sustained pieces of prose about early childhood", but notes that "there is something distinctly odd about it" because there is no mention of his mother, who "is never mentioned in the entire Autobiography." Herbert Williams comments that the exclusion of most of the important women in Powys's life "makes Autobiography, for all its power and candour, a curiously distorted account of himself".

Novelist Margaret Drabble describes it as "one of the most eccentric memoirs ever written", and notes that Powys took "Pepys, Casanova and Rousseau as his models, in his earlier autobiographical work, Confessions of Two Brothers, and that Autobiography has justly been compared to the Confessions of Jean-Jacques Rousseau." Drabble adds that Autobiography rivals these earlier autobiographies "in its frankness and its evasions, in its inconsistency and its emotional intensity, in its egoism and its self-abasement". Powys also alludes in Confessions of Two Brothers to the autobiographical writing of Goethe, Montaigne, Saint Augustine, and Oscar Wilde. J. B. Priestley, in his "Introduction" to the 1967 Macdonald reprint, also refers to the fact that "Its author is astonishingly frank about himself, confessing all manner of aberrations and absurdities."

Critic C. A. Coates suggests that "It is not a chronological account of his sixty years [...] chapters are blocks of land seized upon and described" ranging from Powys's birthplace in Shirley, Derbyshire, to Dorchester, Dorset, where his novel Maiden Castle is set, to his childhood in Montacute, Somersetshire, not far from Glastonbury, to his marriage and living in Sussex, to the many years he lived and lectured in America. It is, however, according to Coates, "impossible to visualize an incident [in Autobiography] without also remembering not its 'setting', but what Powys's emotional, sensuous attitude to that environment was at the time".

The diaries of John Cowper Powys, kept from 1929, several of which have been published, are a source of further autobiographical material, along with numerous published and unpublished letters.

In 1965 Marie Canavaggia received the Prix Gustave Le Métais – Larivière of the French Academy for her translation of the Autobiography (Autobiographie, Gallimard). It has also been translated into German, and Swedish.

== See also ==
- Llewelyn Powys
- Philippa Powys
- T. F. Powys

=== Selected works by J. C. Powys ===
- Confessions of Two Brothers (with Llewelyn Powys) (1916)
- Owen Glendower
- Porius: A Romance of the Dark Ages
- Weymouth Sands
- Wolf Solent
