= Bradford Abbas =

Village and civil parish in Dorset, England

Coordinates: 50.928°N 2.588°W

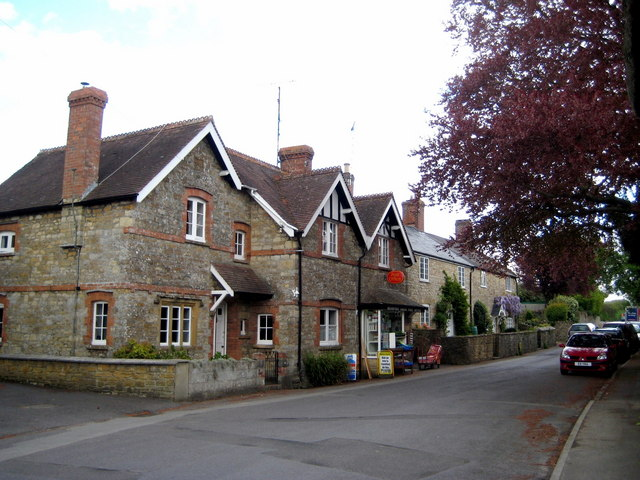
- Church Road, Bradford Abbas

- Location within Dorset
- Population: 975 (2011 Census)
- OS grid reference: ST587144
- Civil parish: Bradford Abbas
- Unitary authority: Dorset
- Ceremonial county: Dorset
- Region: South West
- Country: England
- Sovereign state: United Kingdom
- Post town: SHERBORNE
- Postcode district: DT9
- Dialling code: 01935
- Police: Dorset
- Fire: Dorset and Wiltshire
- Ambulance: South Western
- UK Parliament: West Dorset

Bradford Abbas is a village and civil parish in north-west Dorset, England, on the border with Somerset. The village is 3 miles (5 km) south-east of Yeovil and 5 miles (8 km) south-west of Sherborne. The parish includes the small settlement of Saxon Maybank to the north, and had a population of 975 at the 2011 Census.

The name of the village signifies the "Abbot's broad ford" on the River Ivel, the abbot in question being that of Sherborne; the land was given to Sherborne Abbey by King Alfred the Great.

In the dry summer of 2010 cropmarks in sun-parched fields of barley, visible from the air, revealed the existence of a previously unsuspected 1st-century temporary Roman camp, one of only four detected in southwest Britain. In the 19th century five Roman kilns were found in a field to the east of the village. Also found at the site were pottery, roof slates, bracelets and querns.

== Parish Church of St Mary ==
The oldest part of the church is the chancel, dating from the 12th century, though the main construction of the church is 15th century and was started by William Bradford, Abbot of Sherborne.

The tower has many niches on its west face, two containing finely carved original figures. The stone rood screen dates from the 15th century, and some of the steps leading to the rood loft are still extant.

=== Vicars ===
This is a list of the vicars of St Mary's Church, Bradford Abbas. Since 1984, the title has been Rector of the United Benefice.

- 1310 Richard Alewyn
- 1316 Henry de Brandeston
- 1331 Roger de Fernham
- 1337 William de Penmull
- 1348 Richard de Killatrum
- 1349 John de Mullerorn
- 1361 William Play
- 1399 Edmund Kymerich
- 1426 William Hazelgrove
- 1438 Richard Engelond
- 1439 Thomas Wotton
- 1449 Richard Lymyn
- 1450 William Larder
- 1463 Nicholas Kemel
- 1477 Thomas Taylour
- 1479 Richard Wygynton
- 1487 Thomas Laurence
- 1494 Andrew Kerver
- Nicholas Ponfold
- 1526 Gilbert Style
- 1529 John Babeary
- 1538 Thomas Maister
- 1585 George Punfold
- 1634 George Starr
- 1660 Robert Butt
- 1669 Charles White
- 1733 William Preston
- 1742 Thomas Paget
- 1751 Narcissus Whittaker
- 1767 Conyers Place
- 1777 Edward West
- 1812 Edward Smedley
- 1825 David Williams
- 1828 Robert Grant
- 1886 Gordon Wickham
- 1921 John Vassall
- 1934 Eric Douglas
- 1938 George Kendrick
- 1952 John Perkins
- 1955 Charles Kerslake
- 1956 Donald Blackburn
- 1961 Lawrence Chesterman
- 1963 George Buchanan
- 1967 Gerald Squarey
- 1974 Richard Mentern
- 1984 David Greene
- 2001 J. Evans
- 2010 Michael Anderson
- 2014 Tony Gilbert
