= Gwyddyl Ffichti =

Term that appears in the third series of Welsh Triads

Gwyddyl Ffichti is a term that appears in the third series of Welsh Triads, apparently referring to the Picts. It was central to William Forbes Skene's argument that the Picts were a Goidelic, Celtic-speaking people and that their language was ancestral to modern Scottish Gaelic. The passage in which it appears is believed to be an invention of the 18th/19th century Welsh antiquarian Iolo Morganwg. The suspicion of Morganwg's forgery was first raised by Skene himself in 1868:

It is a peculiarity attaching to almost all of the documents which have emanated from the chair of Glamorgan, in other words, from Iolo Morganwg, that they are not to be found in any of the Welsh MSS. contained in other collections, and that they must be accepted on his authority alone. It is not unreasonable, therefore, to say that they must be viewed with some suspicion, and that very careful discrimination is required in the use of them.

While Skene admitted that the "authenticity of the Triads is not unexceptional", he maintained that the term was valid as it was also present in the Triads of Arthur and his Warriors. Skene revised his position on the nature of the Pictish language to suggest it was an amalgamation of "Welsh" and "Gaelic":

It has been too much narrowed by the assumption that, if it is shewn to be a Celtic dialect, it must of necessity be absolutely identic in all its features either with Welsh or with Gaelic. But this necessity does not really exist; and the result I come to is, that it is not Welsh, neither is it Gaelic; but it is a Gaelic dialect partaking largely of Welsh forms.

== Bibliography ==
- Skene, William Forbes (1837), The Highlanders of Scotland: their origin, history, and antiquities; with a sketch of their manners and customs and an account of the clans into which they were divided, vol. 1, London: John Murray
- Jones, Mary (2005), Jones' Celtic Encyclopedia
- Skene, William Forbes (1868), The Four Ancient Books of Wales, ISBN 9781907256929
