= Glen Cavaliero =

English poet and critic (1927–2019)

Glen Tilburn Cavaliero (7 June 1927 – 28 October 2019) was an English poet and critic.

== Life ==
Glen Cavaliero was born of mixed Italian and north country English descent, and was educated at Tonbridge School in Kent. He studied Modern History at Magdalen College, Oxford, and was a staff member at Lincoln Theological College from 1956 to 1961 before matriculating as a mature student to read English at St Catharine's College, Cambridge in 1965. He was awarded a Ph.D. from Cambridge in 1972. Cavaliero was subsequently a member of the Faculty of English at Cambridge University, a Fellow Commoner of St Catharine's College, a Fellow of the Royal Society of Literature, and the President of the Powys Society.

== Bibliography ==
Criticism

- John Cowper Powys, Novelist, Oxford University Press, 1973.
- The Rural Tradition in the English Novel 1900-1939, Macmillan, 1977
- A Reading of E. M. Forster, Macmillan, 1979
- Charles Williams: Poet of Theology, Macmillan, 1983
- The Supernatural and English Fiction, Oxford University Press, 1995
- The Powys Family: Some Records of a Friendship, Cecil Woolf, 1999
- The Alchemy of Laughter, Palgrave Macmillan, 2000

Poetry

- The Ancient People, Carcanet Press, 1973
- Paradise Stairway, Carcanet Press, 1977
- Elegy for St Anne's, Warren House Press, 1982
- Steeple on a Hill, Tartarus Press, 1997
- Ancestral Haunt, Poetry Salzburg, 2002
- The Christmas Robins and Other Poems, privately printed 2005
- The Justice of the Night, Tartarus Press, 2007
- Towards the Waiting Sun, Poetry Salzburg, 2011
- The Flash of Weathercocks, Troubador, 2016

Short Stories

- "Death of an Author", Weirdly Supernatural #1, 2001

As editor

- Beatrix Potter's Journal, Warne, 1986
