= Winter =

Coldest of the four temperate seasons

Temperate season
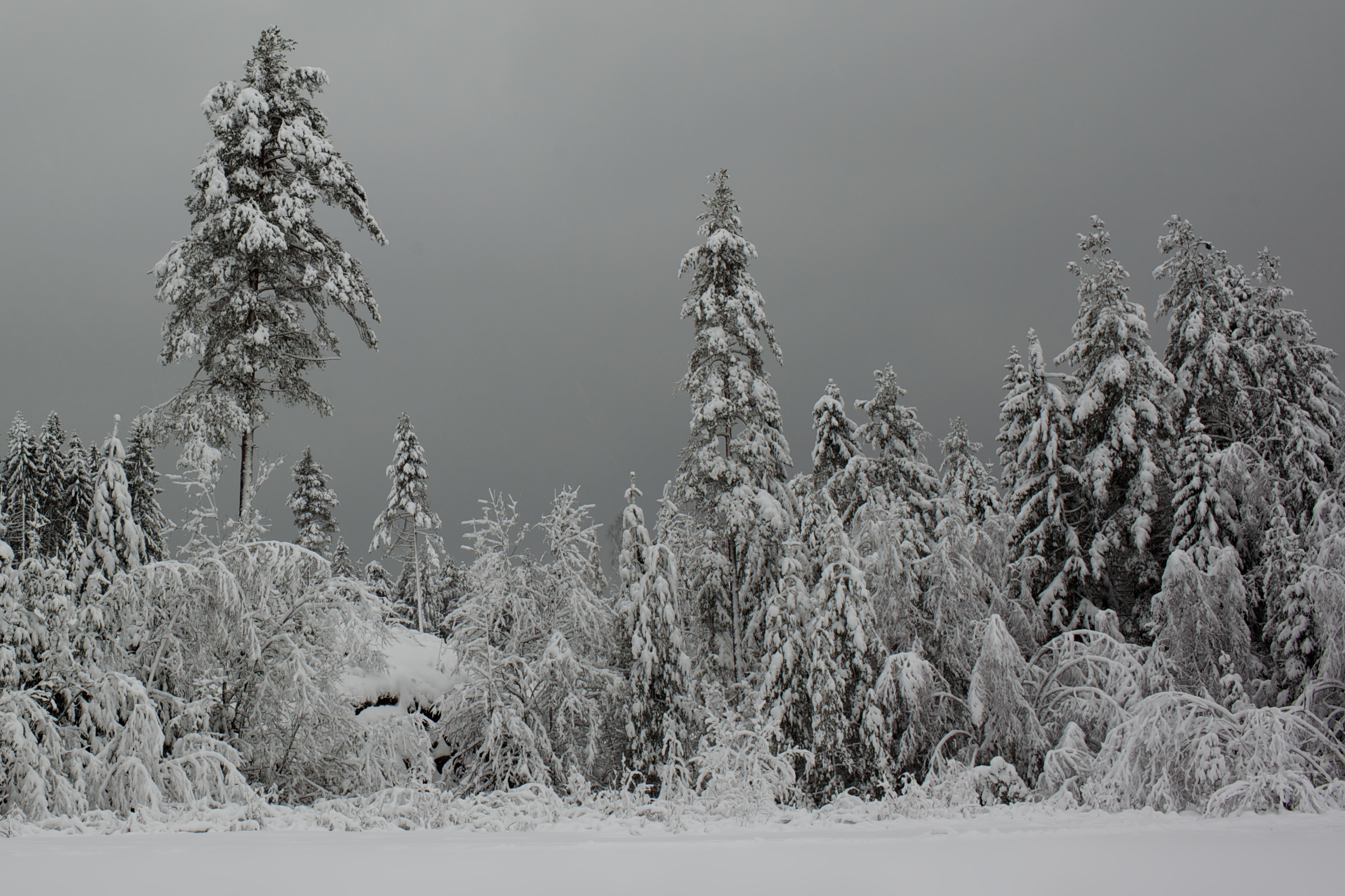
- Forest covered in snow during winter in Norway

Northern temperate zone
- Astronomical season: 21 December – 20 March
- Meteorological season: 1 December – 28/29 February
- Solar (Celtic) season: 1 November – 31 January

Southern temperate zone
- Astronomical season: 21 June – 23 September
- Meteorological season: 1 June – 31 August
- Solar (Celtic) season: 1 May – 31 July
- Summer; Spring Autumn; Winter

Winter is the coldest and darkest season of the year in temperate and polar climates. It occurs after autumn and before spring, when the hemisphere is oriented away from the Sun as a result of the tilt of Earth's axis. Different cultures define different dates as the start of winter, and some use a definition based on weather.

When it is winter in the Northern Hemisphere, it is summer in the Southern Hemisphere, and vice versa. Winter typically brings precipitation that, depending on a region's climate, is mainly rain or snow. The moment of winter solstice is when the Sun's elevation with respect to the North or South Pole is at its most negative value; that is, the Sun is at its farthest below the horizon as measured from the pole. The day on which this occurs has the shortest day and the longest night, with day length increasing and night length decreasing as the season progresses after the solstice.

The earliest sunset and latest sunrise dates outside the polar regions differ from the date of the winter solstice and depend on latitude; this is due to the variation in the solar day throughout the year caused by the Earth's elliptical orbit (see: earliest and latest sunrise and sunset).

== Etymology ==
The English word winter comes from the Proto-Germanic noun *wintru-, whose origin is unclear. Several proposals exist, a commonly mentioned one connecting it to the Proto-Indo-European root *wed- 'water' or a nasal infix variant *wend-.

== Cause ==
The tilt of the Earth's axis relative to its orbital plane plays a large role in the formation of weather. The Earth is tilted at an angle of 23.44° to the plane of its orbit, causing different latitudes to directly face the Sun as the Earth moves through its orbit. This variation brings about seasons. When it is winter in the Northern Hemisphere, the Southern Hemisphere faces the Sun more directly and thus experiences warmer temperatures than the Northern Hemisphere. Conversely, winter in the Southern Hemisphere occurs when the Northern Hemisphere is tilted more toward the Sun. From the perspective of an observer on the Earth, the winter Sun has a lower maximum altitude in the sky than the summer Sun.

During winter in either hemisphere, the lower altitude of the Sun causes the sunlight to hit the Earth at an oblique angle. Thus a lower amount of solar radiation strikes the Earth per unit of surface area. Furthermore, the light must travel a longer distance through the atmosphere, allowing the atmosphere to dissipate more heat. Compared with these effects, the effect of the changes in the distance of the Earth from the Sun (due to the Earth's elliptical orbit) is negligible.

The manifestation of meteorological winter in the northerly snow-prone latitudes is highly variable, depending on elevation, position versus marine winds, and the amount of precipitation. For instance, Winnipeg, a city in the landlocked Great Plains region within Canada, has a January high of −11.3 °C (11.7 °F) and a low of −21.4 °C (−6.5 °F).

In comparison, Vancouver, a city on Canada's west coast with a marine influence from moderating Pacific winds, has a January low of 1.4 °C (34.5 °F), with days well above freezing, at 6.9 °C (44.4 °F). Both cities are at 49°N latitude and in the same western half of the continent. A similar but less extreme effect is found in Europe: despite resting between 49°N to 61°N, the British Isles have no non-mountain weather stations with a below-freezing mean January temperature.

== Timing ==
=== Meteorological reckoning ===
Animation of snow cover changing with the seasons

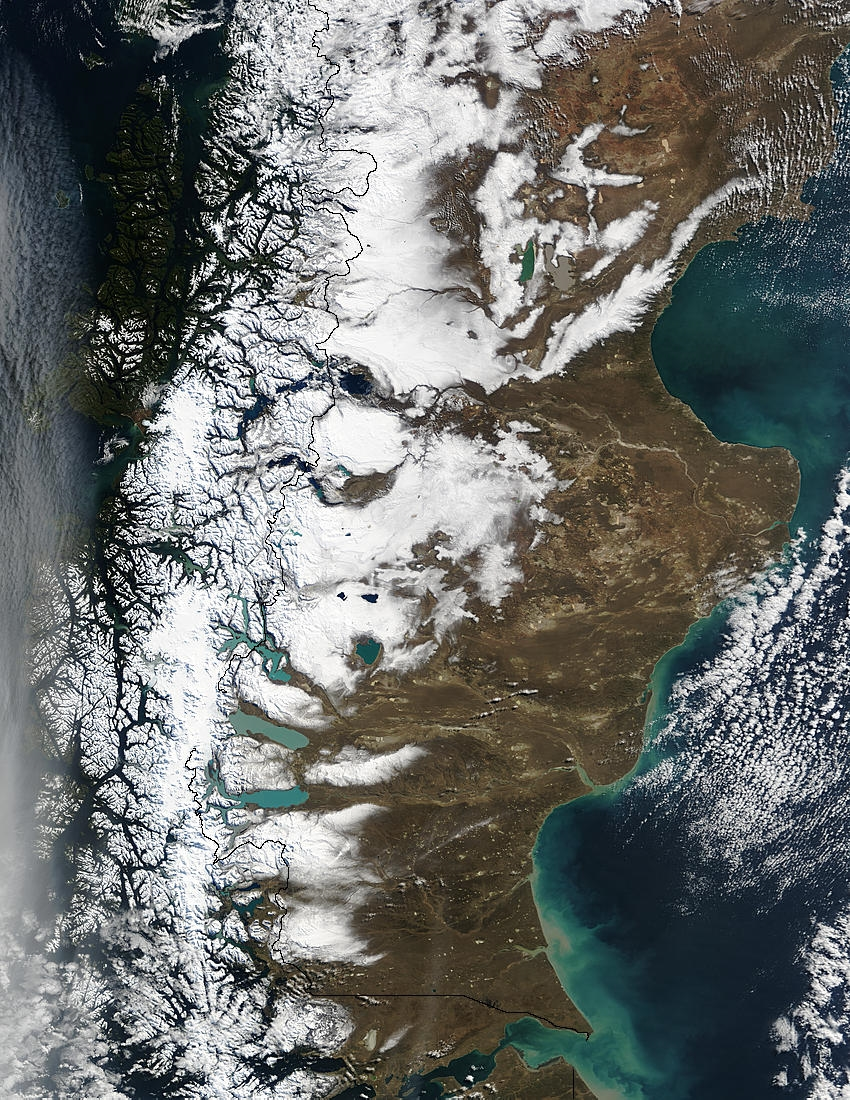
Part of Patagonia in Argentina and Chile during the beginning of winter in the south.

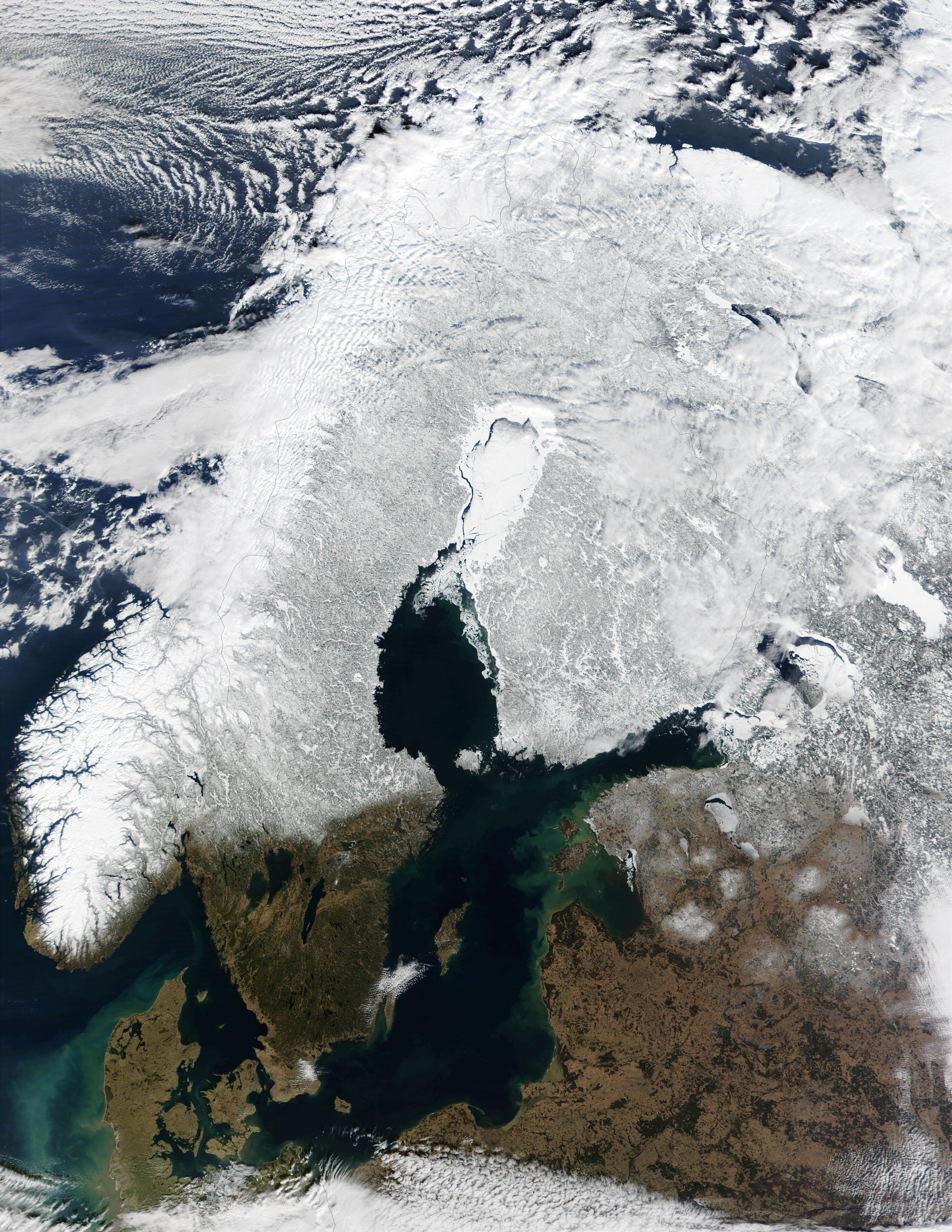
The Scandinavian and Baltic countries during the beginning of winter in the north.

Meteorological reckoning is the method of measuring the winter season used by meteorologists based on "sensible weather patterns" for record keeping purposes, so the start of meteorological winter varies with latitude. Winter is often defined by meteorologists to be the three calendar months with the lowest average temperatures. This corresponds to the months of December, January and February in the Northern Hemisphere, and June, July and August in the Southern Hemisphere.

The coldest average temperatures of the season are typically experienced in January or February in the Northern Hemisphere and in June, July or August in the Southern Hemisphere. Nighttime predominates in the winter season, and in some regions, winter has the highest rate of precipitation as well as prolonged dampness because of permanent snow cover or high precipitation rates coupled with low temperatures, precluding evaporation. Blizzards often develop and cause many transportation delays. Diamond dust, also known as ice needles or ice crystals, forms at temperatures approaching −40 °C (−40 °F) due to air with slightly higher moisture from above mixing with colder, surface-based air. They are made of simple hexagonal ice crystals.

The Swedish Meteorological Institute (SMHI) defines thermal winter as when the daily mean temperatures are below 0 °C (32 °F) for five consecutive days. According to the SMHI, winter in Scandinavia is more pronounced when Atlantic low-pressure systems take more southerly and northerly routes, leaving the path open for high-pressure systems to come in and cold temperatures to occur. As a result, the coldest January on record in Stockholm, in 1987, was also the sunniest.

Accumulations of snow and ice are commonly associated with winter in the Northern Hemisphere, due to the large land masses there. In the Southern Hemisphere, the more maritime climate and the relative lack of land south of 40°S make the winters milder; thus, snow and ice are less common in inhabited regions of the Southern Hemisphere. In this region, snow occurs every year in elevated regions such as the Andes, the Great Dividing Range in Australia, the mountains of New Zealand, and in the southerly Patagonia region of South Argentina. Snow occurs year-round in Antarctica.

The three-month period associated with the coldest average temperatures typically begins somewhere in late November or early December in the Northern Hemisphere and lasts through late February or early March. This "thermological winter" is earlier than the solstice delimited definition, but later than the daylight (Celtic or Chinese) definition. Depending on seasonal lag, this period will vary between climatic regions.

=== Cultural reckoning ===
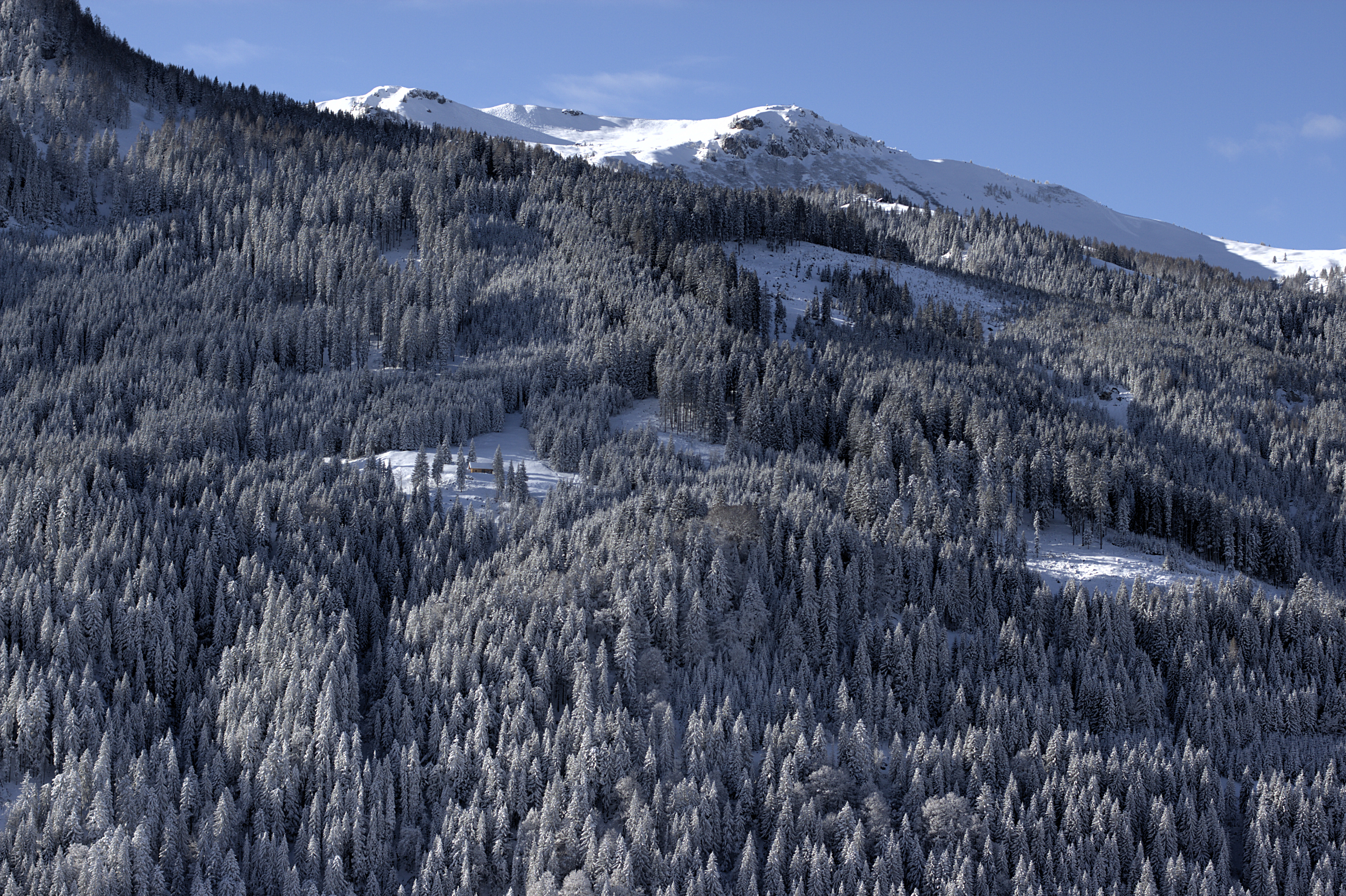
In the mid-latitudes and polar regions, winter is associated with snow and ice.

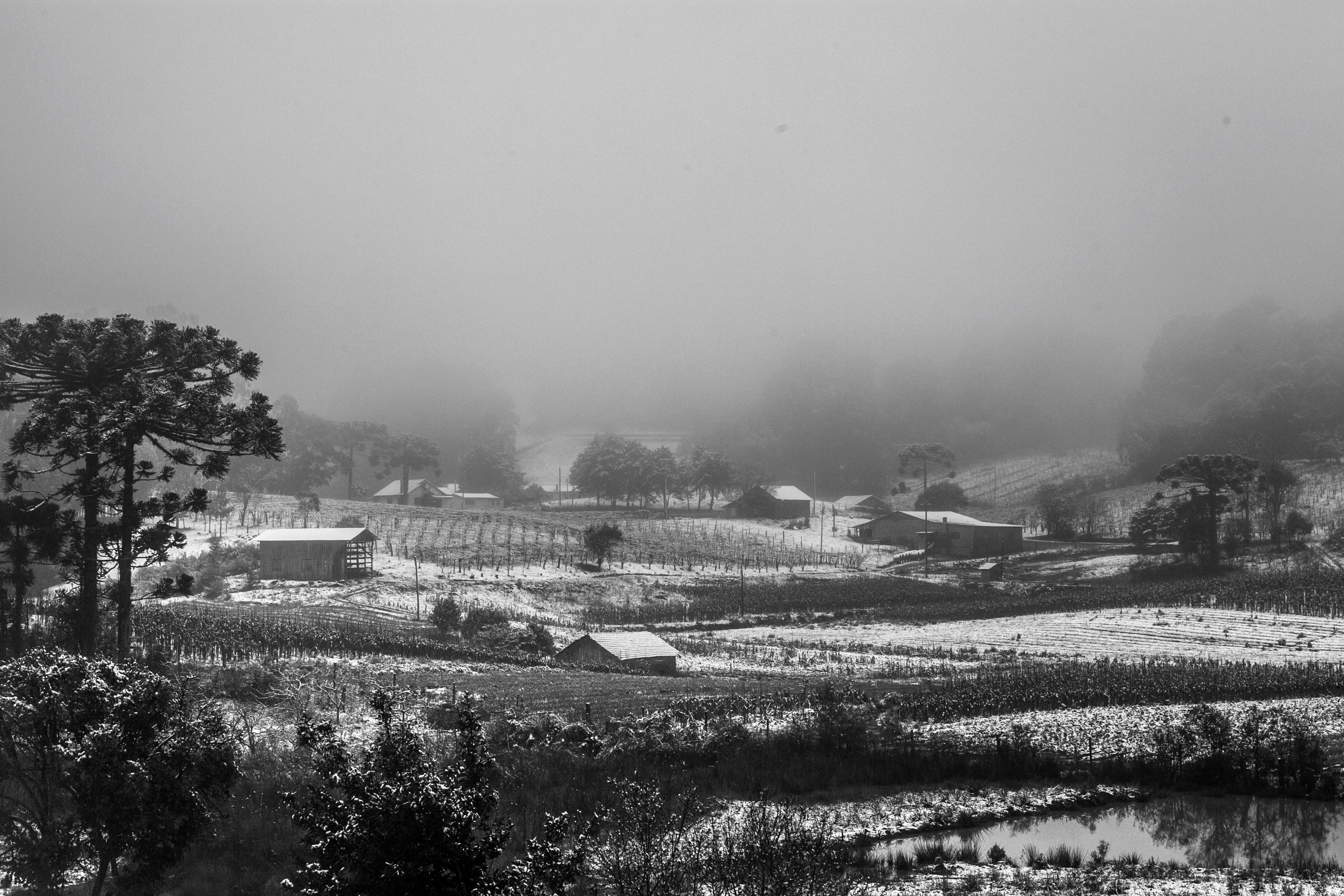
In the Southern Hemisphere, winter extends from June to September, pictured in Caxias do Sul in the southern highlands of Brazil.

Ancient Indo-European cultures seem to have divided the year into two seasons: winter and summer. This idea survived in parts of Europe into the Early Middle Ages, co-existing with the newer idea of four seasons.

In the Julian calendar used in the ancient Roman world, winter began on 10 November, its midpoint was the winter solstice on 25 December, and winter ended on 6 February.

Likewise, in Christian Anglo-Saxon calendars, winter began on 7 November, its midpoint was the solstice or Midwinter on 25 December, and winter ended on 6 February. Bede also mentions an older 'two-season' year, where summer ended and winter began at the full moon during the month of Winterfylleth, in October.

For many mainland European countries, especially Germanic regions, winter began at Martinmas (Saint Martin's Day) on 11 November. The day falls at the midpoint between the old Julian equinox and solstice dates. It was generally regarded as the beginning of winter in late medieval and early modern England.

In Celtic nations, winter began on 1 November and the time around the winter solstice was seen as the middle of winter. In Gaelic Ireland and Scotland, winter began with the festival of Samhain on 1 November and ended with Imbolc on 1 February. Likewise, in Wales, winter began with the festival of Calan Gaeaf ("calends of winter") on 1 November and ended on 1 February.

In Scandinavia, winter is deemed to begin earlier and end later than most of Europe. Among the Norsemen, it opened with the festival of Winter Nights (Vetrnætr), which began on the Thursday between 9 and 15 October. In an old Norwegian tradition, winter begins on 14 October and ends on the last day of February.

Valentine's Day (14 February) is recognized by some countries as heralding the end of winter and beginning of spring.

In Chinese astronomy and other East Asian calendars, winter is taken to commence on or around 7 November, on Lìdōng, and end with the arrival of spring on 3 or 4 February, on Lìchūn.

In many countries in the Southern Hemisphere, including Australia, New Zealand, and South Africa, winter begins on 1 June and ends on 31 August.

In some cultures, the season is regarded as beginning at the solstice and ending on the following equinox. In the Northern Hemisphere, depending on the year, this corresponds to the period between 20, 21 or 22 December and 19, 20 or 21 March.

Since by almost all definitions valid for the Northern Hemisphere, winter spans 31 December and 1 January, meaning that the season takes up two calendar years, as summer does in the Southern Hemisphere. Each calendar year includes parts of two winters. This causes ambiguity in associating a winter with a particular year, e.g. "winter 2001." Solutions for this problem include naming both years, e.g. "winter 2001-02", or settling on the year the season starts in or on the year most of its days belong to, which is the later year for most definitions.

=== Astronomical reckoning ===
In the "astronomical" reckoning, the timing of "winter" is based on astronomical fixed points (i.e., based solely on the position of the Earth in its orbit around the Sun), regardless of weather conditions. In one astronomical reckoning, the winter solstice is the middle of winter; being the day of the year that has fewest hours of daylight. Seasonal lag means that the coldest period normally follows the solstice by a few weeks.

In another astronomical reckoning, winter begins at the winter solstice and ends at the March equinox. These dates are somewhat later than those used to define the beginning and end of the meteorological winter (December, January, and February in the Northern Hemisphere and June, July, and August in the Southern).

== Ecological reckoning and activity ==
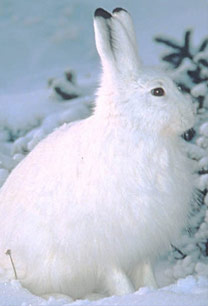
The snowshoe hare, and some other animals, change color in winter.

Ecological reckoning of winter differs from calendar-based by avoiding the use of fixed dates. It is one of six seasons recognized by most ecologists who customarily use the term hibernal for this period of the year (the other ecological seasons being prevernal, vernal, estival, serotinal, and autumnal). The hibernal season coincides with the main period of biological dormancy each year whose dates vary according to local and regional climates in temperate zones of the Earth. The appearance of flowering plants like the crocus can mark the change from ecological winter to the prevernal season as early as late January in mild temperate climates.

To survive the harshness of winter, many animals have developed different behavioral and morphological adaptations for overwintering:

- Migration is a common effect of winter upon animals such as migratory birds. Some butterflies also migrate seasonally.
- Hibernation is a state of reduced metabolic activity during the winter, distinguished from sleep by a marked reduction in metabolic functions. Some animals, such as gophers, frogs, snakes, bats, and bears, become dormant during winter and only come out when the warm weather returns.
- Some animals, such as squirrels, beavers, skunks, badgers, and raccoons, store food for the winter and live on it instead of hibernating completely.
- Resistance is observed when an animal endures winter but changes in ways such as color and musculature. The color of the fur or plumage changes to white to camouflage with snow and thus retains its cryptic coloration year-round. Examples are the rock ptarmigan, Arctic fox, weasel, white-tailed jackrabbit, and mountain hare.
- Some fur-coated mammals grow a heavier coat during the winter to improve the heat-retention qualities of fur. The coat is then shed following the winter season to allow better cooling. The heavier coat in winter made it a favorite season for trappers, who sought more profitable skins.
- Snow also affects the ways animals behave; many take advantage of the insulating properties of snow by burrowing in it. Mice and voles typically live under the snow layer.

Some annual plants never survive the winter. Other annual plants require winter cold to complete their life cycle; this is known as vernalization. As for perennials, many small ones profit from the insulating effects of snow by being buried in it. Larger plants, particularly deciduous trees, usually let their upper part go dormant, but their roots are still protected by the snow layer. Few plants bloom in the winter, one exception being the flowering plum, which flowers in time for Chinese New Year. The process by which plants become acclimated to cold weather is called hardening.

== Examples ==
=== Exceptionally cold ===
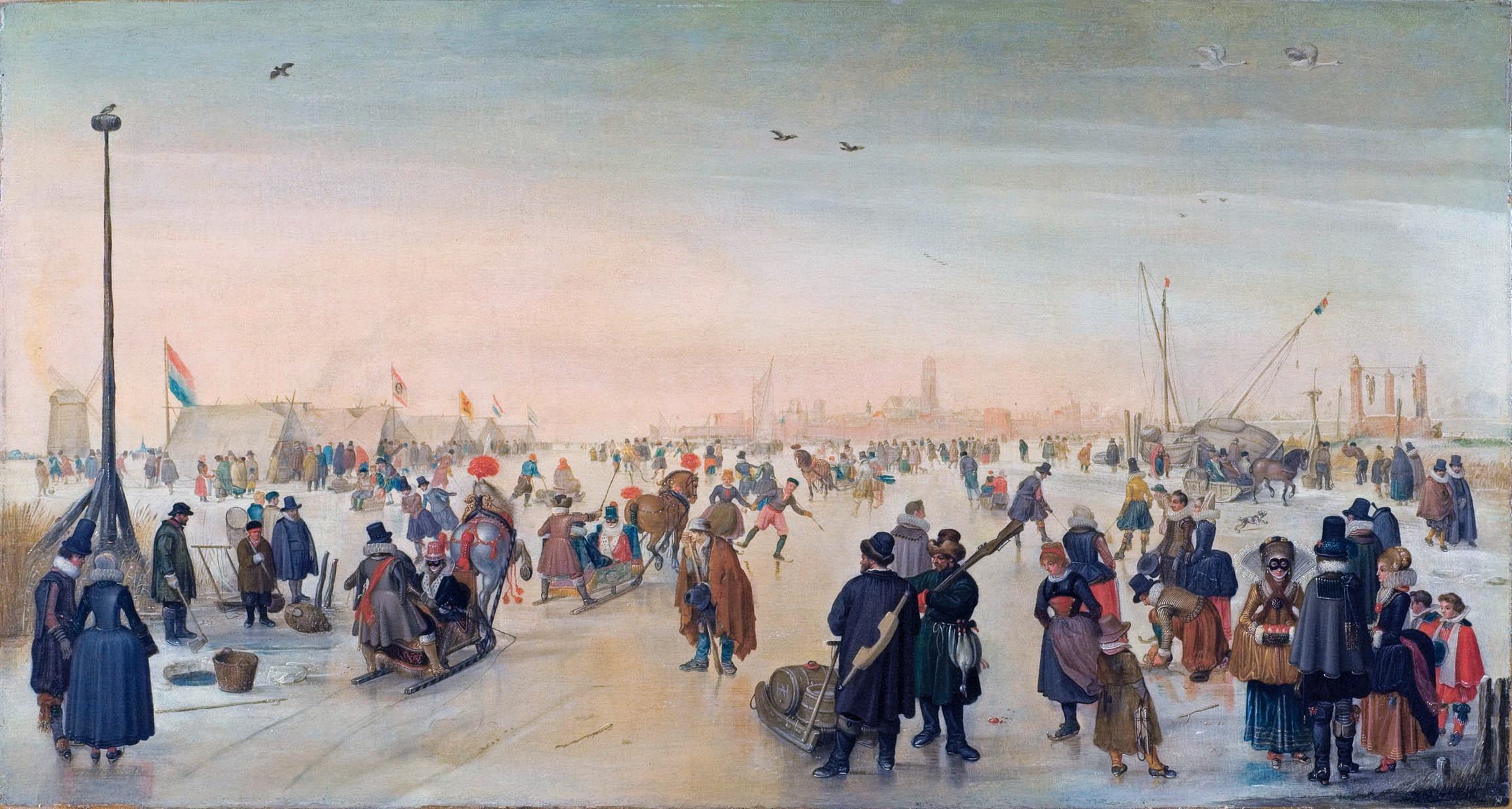
Winter landscape with skaters in the Dutch Republic during the Little Ice Age in the 17th century, by Hendrick Avercamp

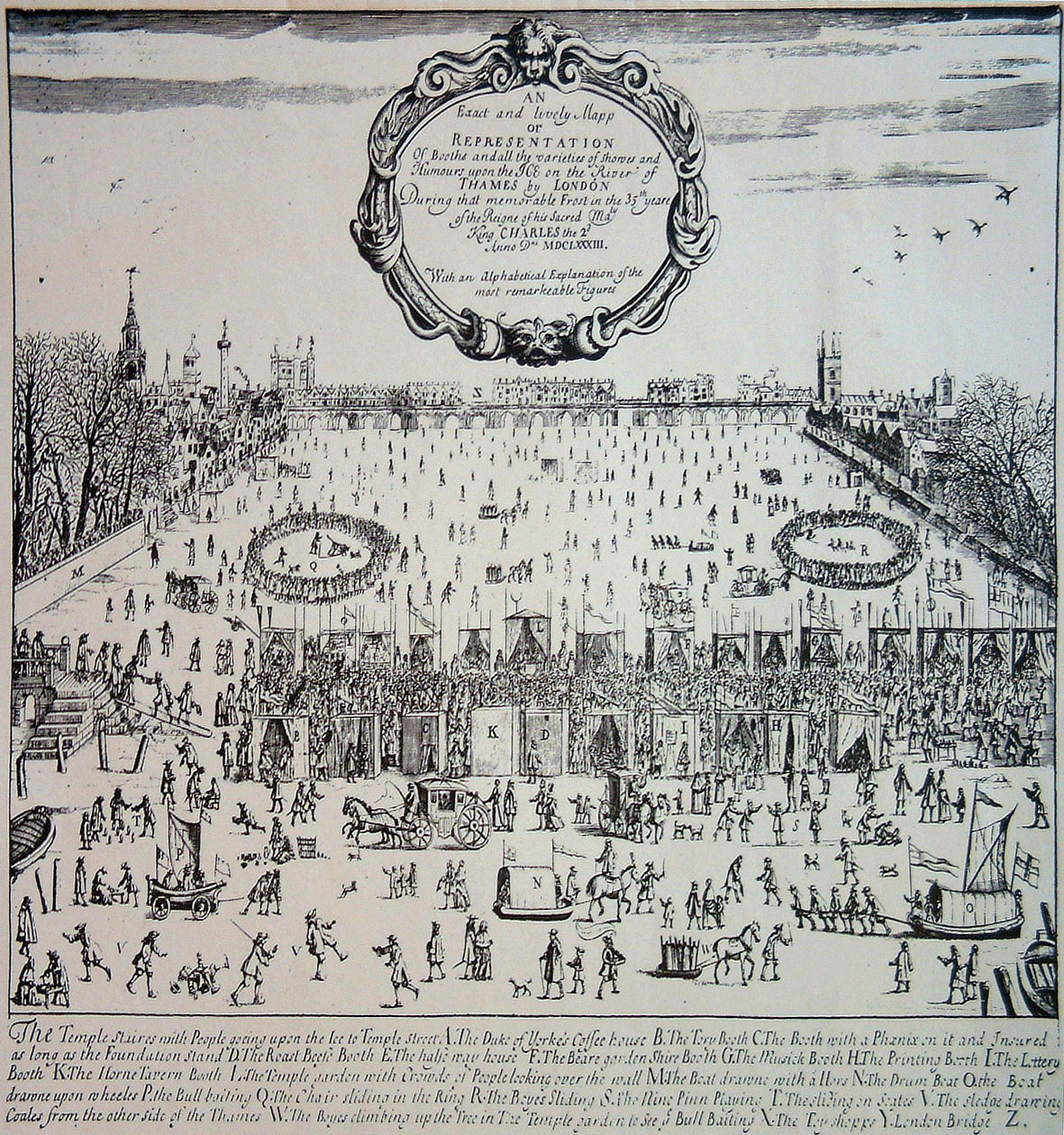
River Thames frost fair, 1683, with Old London Bridge in the background

- 1683–1684, "The Great Frost", when the Thames, hosting the River Thames frost fairs, was frozen all the way up to London Bridge and remained frozen for about two months. Ice was about 27 cm (11 in) thick in London and about 120 cm (47 in) thick in Somerset. The sea froze up to 2 miles (3.2 km) out around the coast of the southern North Sea, causing severe problems for shipping and preventing use of many harbors.
- 1739–1740, one of the most severe winters in the UK on record. The Thames remained frozen over for about 8 weeks. The Irish famine of 1740–1741 claimed the lives of at least 300,000 people.
- 1816 was the Year Without a Summer in the Northern Hemisphere. The unusual coolness of the winter of 1815–1816 and of the following summer was primarily due to the eruption of Mount Tambora in Indonesia, in April 1815. There were secondary effects from an unknown eruption or eruptions around 1810, and several smaller eruptions around the world between 1812 and 1814. The cumulative effects were worldwide but were especially strong in the Eastern United States, Atlantic Canada, and Northern Europe. Frost formed in May in New England, killing many newly planted crops, and the summer never recovered. Snow fell in New York and Maine in June, and ice formed in lakes and rivers in July and August. In the UK, snow drifts remained on hills until late July, and the Thames froze in September. Agricultural crops failed and livestock died in much of the Northern Hemisphere, resulting in food shortages and the worst famine of the 19th century.
- 1887–1888: There were record cold temperatures in the Upper Midwest, heavy snowfalls worldwide, and amazing storms, including the Schoolhouse Blizzard of 1888 (in the Midwest in January) and the Great Blizzard of 1888 (in the Eastern US and Canada in March).
- In Europe, the winters of early 1947, February 1956, 1962–1963, 1981–1982, and 2009–2010 were abnormally cold. The UK winter of 1946–1947 started out relatively normal but became one of the snowiest UK winters to date, with nearly continuous snowfall from late January until March.
- In South America, the winter of 1975 was one of the strongest, with record snow occurring at 25°S in cities of low altitude, with the registration of −17 °C (1.4 °F) in some parts of southern Brazil.
- In the eastern United States and Canada, the winter of 2013–2014 and the second half of February 2015 were abnormally cold.

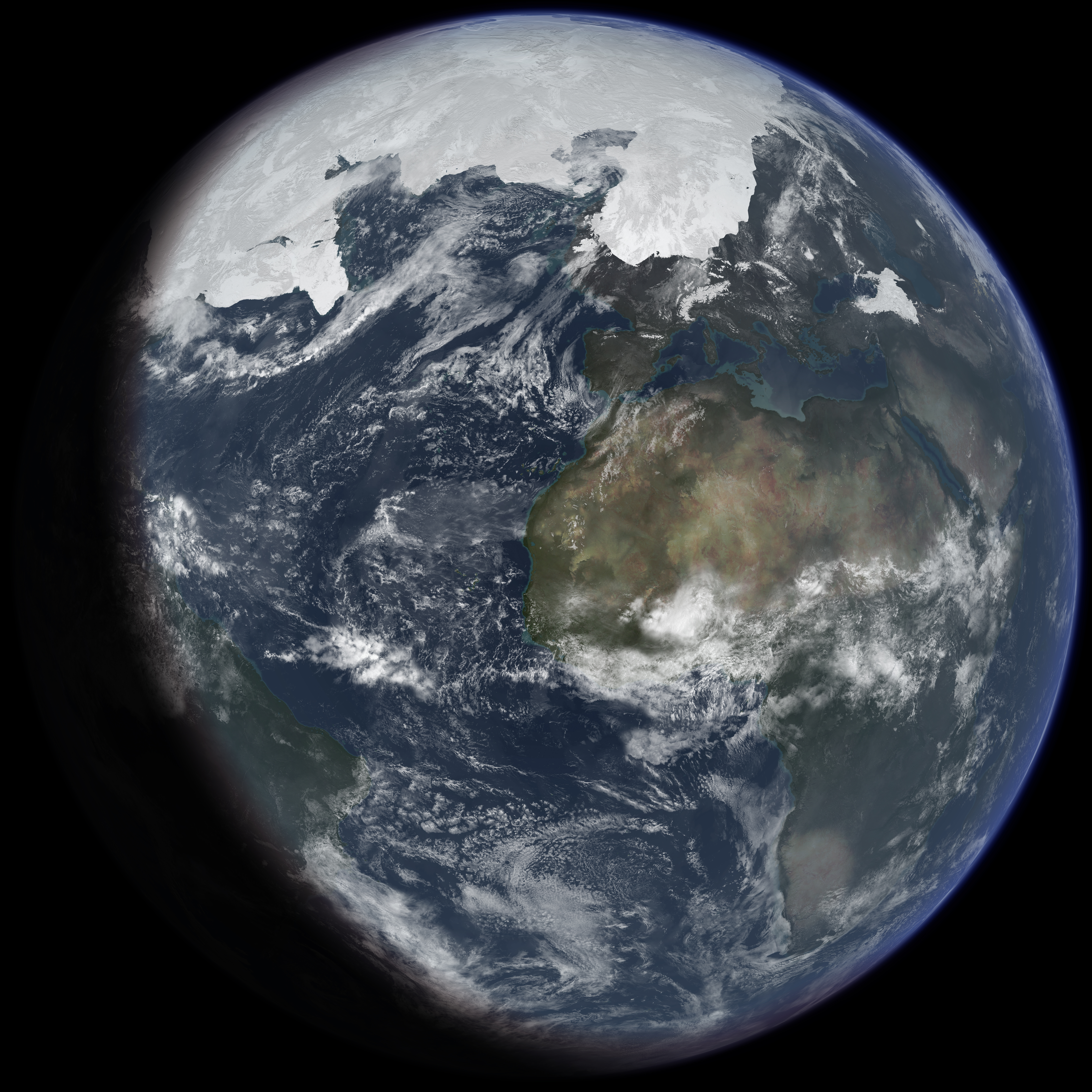
Period of Ice Age on Earth

=== Historically significant ===
- 1310–1330: Many severe winters and cold, wet summers in Europe, the first clear manifestation of the unpredictable weather of the Little Ice Age that lasted for several centuries (from about 1300 to 1900). The persistently cold, wet weather caused great hardship, was primarily responsible for the Great Famine of 1315–1317, and strongly contributed to the weakened immunity and malnutrition leading up to the Black Death (1348–1350).
- 1600–1602: Extremely cold winters in Switzerland and Baltic region after the eruption of Huaynaputina in Peru in 1600.
- 1607–1608: In North America, ice persisted on Lake Superior until June. Londoners held their first frost fair on the frozen-over River Thames.
- 1622: In Turkey, the Golden Horn and southern section of Bosphorus froze over.
- 1690s: Extremely cold, snowy, severe winters. Ice surrounded Iceland for miles in every direction.
- 1779–1780: Scotland's coldest winter on record, and ice surrounded Iceland in every direction (like in the 1690s). In the United States, a record five-week cold spell bottomed out at −20 °F (−29 °C) in Hartford, Connecticut and −16 °F (−27 °C) in New York City. The Hudson River and New York's harbor froze over.
- 1783–1786: The Thames partially froze, and snow remained on the ground for months. In February 1784, the North Carolina was frozen in Chesapeake Bay.
- 1794–1795: A severe winter, with the coldest January in the UK and lowest temperature ever recorded in London: −21 °C (−6 °F) on 25 January. The cold began on Christmas Eve and lasted until late March, with a few temporary warm-ups. The Severn and Thames froze, and frost fairs started up again. The French army tried to invade the Netherlands over its frozen rivers, while the Dutch fleet was stuck in its harbor. The winter had easterlies (from Siberia) as its dominant feature.
- 1813–1814: Severe cold, last freeze-over of Thames, and last frost fair. (Removal of old London Bridge and changes to river's banks made freeze-overs less likely.)
- 1883–1888: Colder temperatures worldwide, including an unbroken string of abnormally cold and brutal winters in the Upper Midwest, related to the explosion of Krakatoa in August 1883. There was snow recorded in the UK as early as October and as late as July during this period.
- 1976–1977: One of the coldest winters in the US in decades.
- 1985: Arctic outbreak in the US resulting from shift in polar vortex, with many cold temperature records broken.
- 2002–2003 was an unusually cold winter in the Northern and Eastern US.
- 2010–2011: Persistent bitter cold in the entire eastern half of the US from December onward, with few or no midwinter warm-ups, and with cool conditions continuing into spring. La Niña and negative Arctic oscillation were strong factors. Heavy and persistent precipitation contributed to almost constant snow cover in the Northeastern US, which finally receded in early May.
- 2011 was one of the coldest on record in New Zealand, with sea level snow falling in Wellington in July for the first time in 35 years and a much heavier snowstorm for 3 days in a row in August.

== Effect on humans ==
Humans are sensitive to winter cold, which compromises the body's ability to maintain both core and surface heat of the body. Slipping on icy surfaces is a common cause of winter injuries. Other injuries from the cold include:

- Hypothermia — Shivering, leading to uncoordinated movements and death.
- Frostbite — Freezing of skin, leading to loss of feeling and damaged tissue.
- Trench foot — Numbness, leading to damaged tissue and gangrene.
- Chilblains — Capillary damage in digits can lead to more severe cold injuries.

Rates of influenza, COVID-19, and other respiratory diseases also increase during the winter.

== Mythology ==
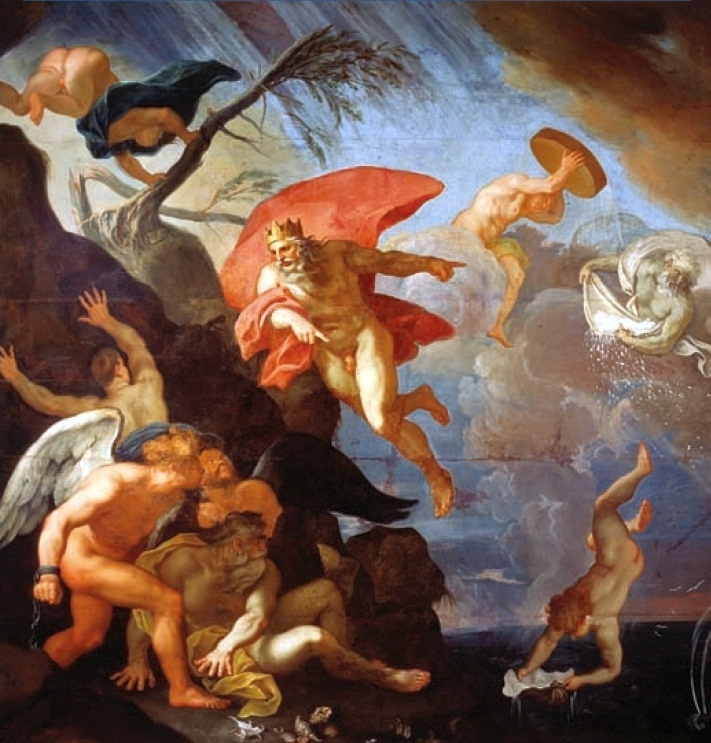
Allegory of Winter by Jerzy Siemiginowski-Eleuter with Aeolus' Kingdom of the Winds, 1683, Wilanów Palace

In Persian culture, the winter solstice is called Yaldā (meaning: birth) and has been celebrated for thousands of years. It is referred to as the eve of the birth of Mithra, who symbolised light, goodness and strength on Earth.

In Greek mythology, Hades kidnapped Persephone to be his wife. Zeus ordered Hades to return her to Demeter, the goddess of the Earth and her mother. Hades tricked Persephone into eating the food of the dead, so Zeus decreed that she spend six months with Demeter and six months with Hades. During the time her daughter is with Hades, Demeter became depressed and caused winter.

In Welsh mythology, Gwyn ap Nudd abducted a maiden named Creiddylad. On May Day, her lover, Gwythr ap Greidawl, fought Gwyn to win her back. The battle between them represented the contest between summer and winter.

- Old Man Winter
- Jack Frost
- Ded Moroz
- Snegurochka
- Vetr

== See also ==
- Cold wave
- Cold-weather warfare
- Fimbulwinter
- Global cooling
- Global warming
- Nuclear winter
- Old Man Winter
- Pineapple Express
- Siberian Express
- Volcanic winter
- Winter festivals (list)
- Winter City
- Winter clothing
- Winter Hexagon
- Winter Olympic Games
- Winter sport
- Winter War
- Christmas
- New Year
