= Wyllt =

Wyllt is a surname. Notable people with the surname include:

- Cyledr Wyllt, warrior in Welsh mythology
- Myrddin Wyllt, prophet in Welsh mythology
