= A Glastonbury Romance =

1932 novel by John Cowper Powys

- First edition (US)
- Author: John Cowper Powys
- Language: English
- Genre: Novel
- Publisher: Simon & Schuster (US); The Bodley Head (UK)
- Publication date: 6 March 1932
- Publication place: England
- Media type: Print (Hardback & Paperback)
- Pages: 1174 (1932, New York)
- ISBN: 0-7156-3648-0
- OCLC: 76798317
- Dewey Decimal: 823.912
- LC Class: PR6031.O867
- Preceded by: Wolf Solent
- Followed by: Weymouth Sands

A Glastonbury Romance was written by John Cowper Powys (1872–1963) in rural upstate New York and first published by Simon and Schuster in New York City in March 1932. An English edition published by John Lane followed in 1933. It has "nearly half-a-million words" and was described as "probably the longest undivided novel in English".

It is the second of Powys's Wessex novels, along with Wolf Solent (1929), Weymouth Sands (1934) and Maiden Castle (1936). Powys was an admirer of Thomas Hardy and these novels are set in Somerset and Dorset, parts of Hardy's mythical Wessex. (Note: Powys's first novel Wood and Stone (1915) was dedicated to Thomas Hardy. See also Autobiography (1967), pp. 224–25, 227, 229–30, etc.) The action occurs over roughly a year, and the first two chapters of A Glastonbury Romance take place in Norfolk, where the late Canon William Crow's will is read, and the Crow family learn that his secretary-valet John Geard has inherited his wealth. Also in Norfolk, a romance begins between cousins, John and Mary Crow. However, after an important scene at the ancient monument of Stonehenge, the rest of the action takes place in or near the Somerset town of Glastonbury, which is some ten miles north of the village of Montacute. Powys's father, the Reverend Charles Francis Powys (1843–1923), was parish priest of Montacute from 1885 to 1918, and it was here that Powys grew up. The grail legends associated with the town of Glastonbury are of major importance in this novel, and Welsh mythology has, for the first time, a significant role.

== Summary of the plot ==
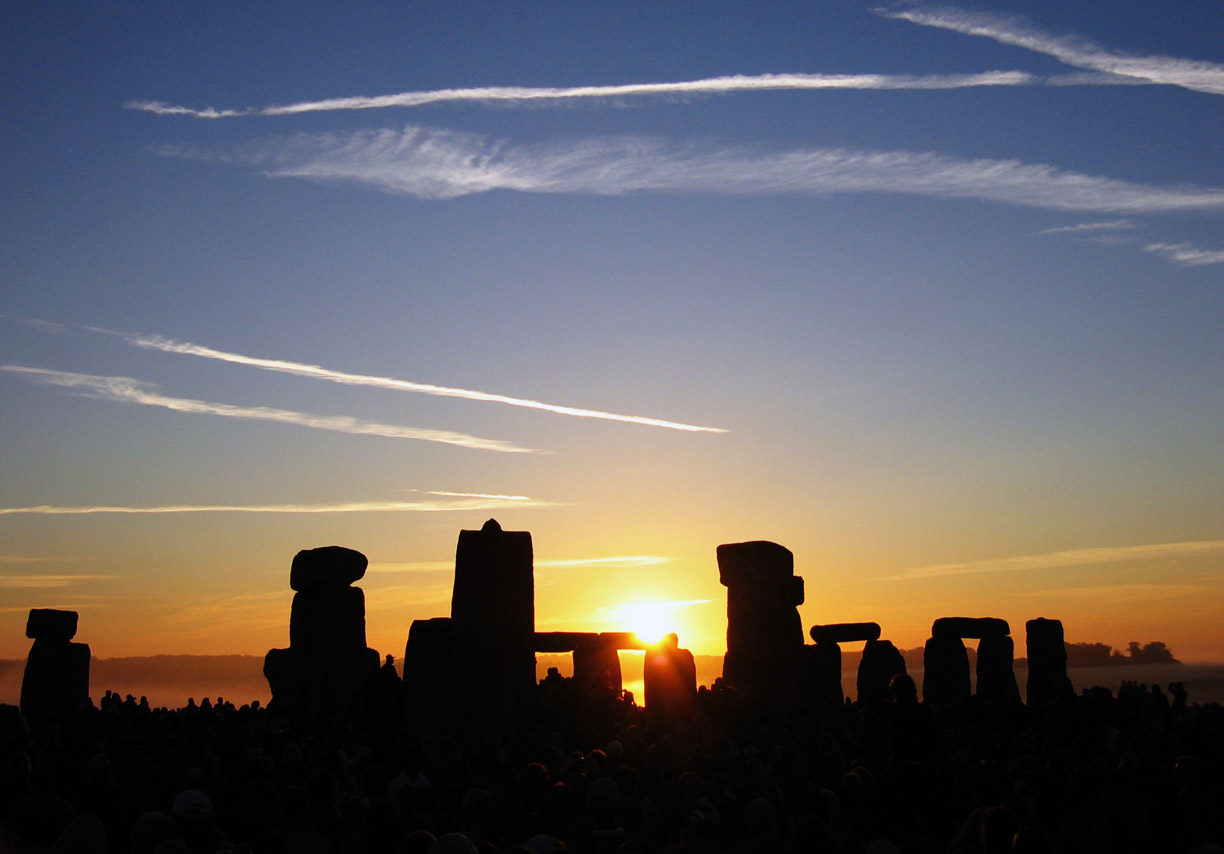
Sunrise at Stonehenge on the summer solstice, 21 June 2005

The book is divided into two sections, which reflects Simon and Schuster's original plan to publish the book in two separate volumes, as they had done with Wolf Solent. The climax of volume 1 is Geard's pageant, part of his plan to revive Glastonbury as a place of religious pilgrimage. The Pageant has three parts: "Arthurian scenes at the beginning", then a "Christmas 'Passion Play' ", followed by a final "prehistoric portion". However the Pageant ends abruptly during the second part, when Owen Evans, who is enacting Christ's death on the Cross, collapses. In volume 2's final chapter, "The Flood", the sea invades the land, Geard dies, and Glastonbury becomes an island once again.

The action begins in Norfolk with the funeral Canon William Crow and the reading of his will, and where the romance between the cousins John and Mary Crow begins. The Crow family members are shocked to learn that William' Crow's secretary-valet, John Geard, has inherited most of the deceased's wealth. John Crow then sets off to walk to Glastonbury, where he will rejoin Mary. While crossing Salisbury Plain he is offered a ride in Owen Evans' car and the two men visit Stonehenge.

A central aspect of A Glastonbury Romance is the attempt by John Geard, ex-minister, who becomes the mayor, to restore Glastonbury to its medieval glory as a place of religious pilgrimage. On the other hand, the Glastonbury industrialist Philip Crow, along with John and Mary Crow, and Tom Barter, all whom are from Norfolk, view the myths and legends of the town with contempt. Philip's vision is of a future with more mines and more factories. John Crow, however, as he is penniless, takes on the task of organizing a pageant for Geard. At the same time an alliance of Anarchists, Marxists, and Jacobins try to turn Glastonbury into a commune.

Like Powys, Owen Evans is a devoted student of Welsh mythology. He also resembles Powys in that he has strong urges toward violence and sadism, and is often tempted by sadistic pornography. But Evans is not the only character that resembles his creator, as both John Geard and John Crow reflect, in different ways, aspects of Powys's personality.

A Glastonbury Romance has several climactic moments, before the major final one. Firstly there is Sam Dekker's decision, following his Grail vision, to give-up of his adulterous affair with Nell Zoyland, and to lead a monk-like existence. Then there is Evans' failed attempt to destroy his sadistic urge by playing the part of Christ on the Cross at the Easter Pageant, followed by his wife Cordelia's ability to defeat his desire to witness a murder. The attempted murder of John Crow is equally climatic, but this involves Tom Barter's death, when he saves his friend John Crow, who is Mad Bet's intended victim.

Finally the novel concludes with the a flooding of the low lying country surrounding Glastonbury, so that it becomes once again the legendary Isle of Avalon. This leads the death of Geard, and ends his ambitious plans for Glastonbury. However, the ending is ambiguous, rather than tragic, because Geard had earlier had asked John Crow: "do you suppose anyone's ever committed suicide out of an excess of life, simply to enjoy the last experience in full consciousness?"

In the novel's final pages there is a panegyric to "the great goddess Cybele", the "Goddess Earth" (See also - Gaia, Demeter, Persephone, Rhea), whom "The powers of reason and science gather in the strong light of the Sun to beat ... down. But evermore she rises again".

== Characters ==
The numerous inhabitants of Glastonbury, include: "a sadist, a madwoman, a vicar, a procuress, eccentric servants, spinster ladies, lovelorn maidens, lesbians ... anarchists, communists, romantic lovers, old men, and young children".

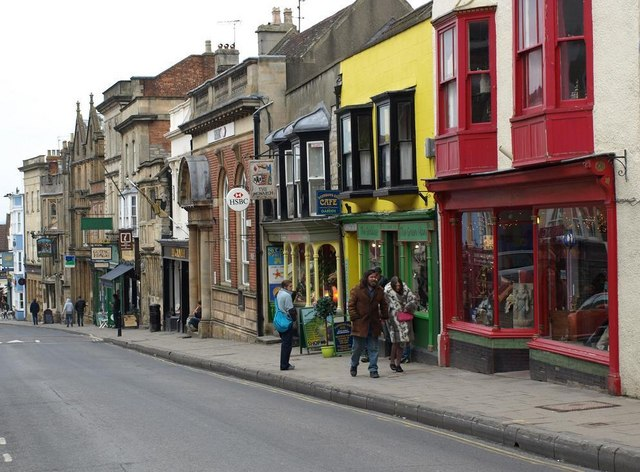
The High Street, Glastonbury

- John Geard, a mystic who influenced the late Canon Crow of Glastonbury and received the man's riches when he died. Geard becomes mayor of the town during the course of the novel and becomes obsessed with the Grail Legend, commissioning new monuments for the town and promoting his own religious brand of Grail-worship. He is married to Megan Geard—a marriage that is still physically passionate unlike that of Geard's rival, Philip Crow. Geard becomes fascinated with the youthful and delicate daughter of the Marquis of P., Rachel Zoyland. Megan Geard has Welsh ancestry, as her maiden name was Rhys. The Geard's were a prominent family of Baptists in Montacute, where Powys's father was vicar for 32 years.
- Cordelia Geard, daughter of John and Megan Geard. She is described as "very plain" and "very dark", "with a thin, awkward bony figure". Her name Cordelia may indicate a mythological identification with Creiddylad, daughter of Lludd in The Mabinogion. Her admirer, Owen Evans, identifies her with the Grail Messenger. Creiddylad is the name that Porius gives to the giantess in Powys's novel, Porius.
- Crummie Geard, Cordelia's beautiful, younger sister, who has "fair" hair and "violet-coloured eyes". She is in love with Sam Dekker, and is described by Glen Cavaliero, as a grail-bearer to Sam.
- John Crow, a young man from Norfolk who comes from France to attend funeral of his grandfather Canon William Crow. There he meets his cousin Mary Crow, who he later marries. He walks to Glastonbury, where he works for John Geard. A skeptic and cynic, he sees his work for Geard as a way of mocking the Grail-worship he is supposed to promote.
- Philip Crow, a cousin to John and an industrialist, who owns Wookey Hole Caves. He is widely hated by the citizens of the town for his attempt to industrialise it. He too hates the Grail legend, and seeks to unseat Geard.
- Tom Barter, a childhood friend of John Crow, from Norfolk. He initially works for Philip Crow but leaves to join John Geard. He is a somewhat depressed womaniser who carries a flame for Mary Crow but marries Tossie Stickles, after she becomes pregnant.
- Owen Evans, a Welshman, obsessed student of Welsh mythology, mystic, antiquarian, and a friend of John Crow. He has strong sadistic urges, and is tempted by an anonymous pornographic book. He is writing a book on Merlin, the magician of Arthurian legend.
- Mat Dekker, the town vicar. He is also wary of Geard's new religion and is also described as being an enemy of the anthropomorphised sun.
- Sam Dekker, the vicar's son. He carries an on-and-off affair with Nell Zoyland, wife of Will Zoyland, and goes through several spiritual conversions during the course of the novel. According to Morine Krissdóttir, "Sam is the virtuous Perceval of medieval myth; the Fisher King is this story Christ himself".
- Persephone Spear, wife of Communist leader Dave Spear and longtime mistress to Philip Crow.
- Mad Bet, (Bet Chinnock) a bald, witch-like madwoman who encourages Finn Toller to commit murder. She is identified with the Grail Messenger.
- Finn Toller (alias, Codfin), who accidentally kills Tom Barter when he attempts to murder John Crow.
- Edward Athling, a farmer-poet who creates the "libretto" for the Glastonbury Pageant.
- Red Robinson, a "cockney communist, who was always plotting troubles and strikes in Philip's factories. Red hates Philip Crow and plots, with fellow communist Dave Spear and philosophical anarchist Paul Trent, to establish a commune in Glastonbury, along the lines of the Paris Commune of 1871.
- Paul Trent, a solicitor from the Scilly Isles of Cornwall, who plans to set up an office in Glastonbury. He is a philosophical anarchist.

== Publication history ==
- A Glastonbury Romance was first published by Simon & Schuster in New York in 1932 and in London by John Lane in 1933.
- Subsequently, cuts were made to the 3rd impression of the Lane edition, following a libel suit in 1934 by Captain Hodgkinson, the owner of Wookey Hole caves. along with an apology. There were two further impressions with the apology and cuts.
- When Macdonald reprinted the novel in 1955, further cuts were made, including the deletion of eight pages from the end of chapter 8: "Wookey Hole".
- Subsequent editions
  - Picador 1975,
  - Outlook Duckworth 1996,
  - Penguin 1999, were photocopied from the 1955 edition.

Full details of the cuts are given Paul Cheshire's essay, "A Glastonbury Romance: Cuts and Alterations to the UK Printed Texts 1932-1955", The Powys Journal, vol. XXVII (2017), pp. 65-86. Earlier, Penny Smith discussed the cuts in "The 'Cave of the man-eating Mothers': its location in A Glastonbury Romance", The Powys Review, 9 (1981/82), pp. 10-37.

For an online copy of the 5th impression of the Lane edition from 1934, see #Further reading, below.

=== Lawsuit ===
In 1934, Powys and his English publishers were successfully sued for libel by Gerard Hodgkinson, real-life owner of the Wookey Hole caves, who claimed that the character of Philip Crow had been based on him. The damages awarded crippled Powys financially, and he was forced to make substantial changes to the English edition of his next novel, which was initially published in America as Weymouth Sands (1934). The title of the English version was changed to Jobber Skald (1935) and all references to the real-life Weymouth were cut.

== Introduction ==
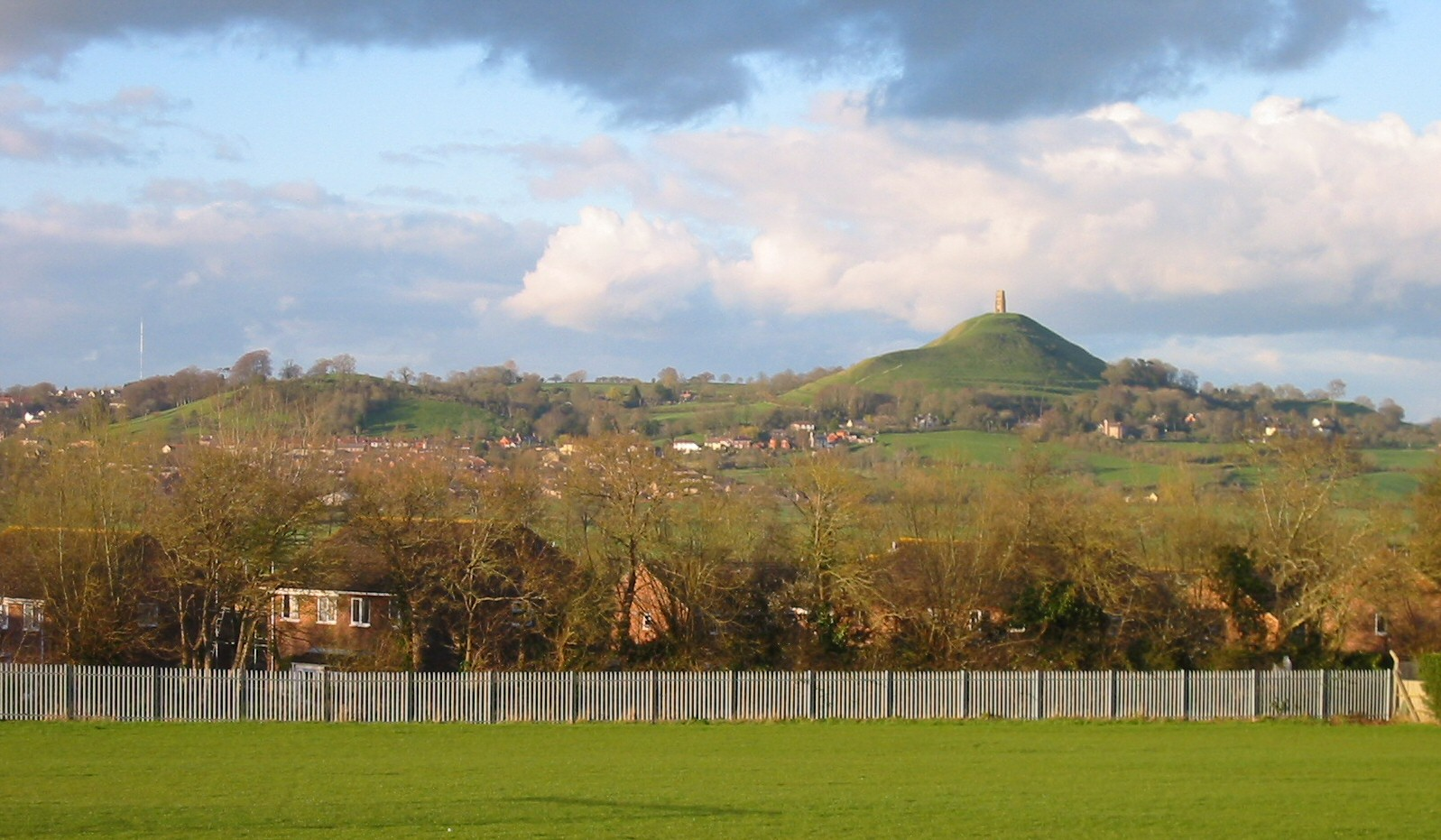
Glastonbury Tor from Street, Somerset

It "was conceived on an uncompromisingly huge scale, with a cast of hundreds". In his preface to the 1955 edition Powys states the novel's "heroine is the Grail", however, in 1932 he described "Glastonbury herself" as "the hero of the story. Its central concern is with the various myths and legends along with history associated with Glastonbury. It is also possible to see most of the main characters, John Geard, Sam Dekker, John Crow, and Owen Evans as undertaking a Grail quest.

However, the opening chapters are concerned with John Crow's arrival in Northwold, Norfolk, to attend his grandfather's funeral and the reading of the will. Northwold was where Powys spent memorable holidays as a child at his maternal grandfather, William Cowper Johnson's, rectory. Johnson was Rector of Northwold from 1880 until 1892. In 1878 was made an Honorary Canon of Norwich Cathedral. Like John Crow, Powys would have arrived at Brandon railway station and similarly boated and fished on the River Wissey. In 1929 he had revisited Northwold with his brother Littleton.

Central to the novel is John Geard's plan to revive Glastonbury as a centre of religious pilgrimage. Part of his plan is an elaborate pageant that includes the various myths and legends associated with the town. It is worth noting that beginning in 1924 annual pilgrimages "to the ruins of Glastonbury Abbey" began to take place, initially organized by some local churches. Pilgrimages continue today to be held; in the second half of June for the Anglicans and early in July for the Catholics and they attract visitors from all over Western Europe. Services are celebrated in the Anglican, Roman Catholic and Eastern Orthodox traditions. The abbey site is visited by over 100,000 a year. With regard to Geard's pageant, W. J. Keith notes that "the chapter entitled 'The Pageant' occurs exactly halfway" in the novel, and that because "of its structural and thematic importance is therefore central in two senses of that word". Margaret Drabble also recognizes the importance of this chapter, describing its 55 pages as "a narrative tour de force. She notes that it involves "not only the 50 and more named characters ... but a cast of thousands" with "the whole town ... either taking part or providing the audience". There are Arthurian scenes at the beginning, followed by the Christmas 'Passion Play', and a final a prehistoric portion, which is not performed. "The pageant ends ... unintentionally, with the physical collapse of Evans" playing the role of Christ on the cross.

The novel has several climaxes that relate to the completion of the Grail quest of major characters and the murder of Tom Barter. At the novel's end, much of the city is flooded, in reference to the myth that held Glastonbury to be the original Island of Avalon of Arthurian legend. The novel closes with a drowning John Geard looking to Glastonbury Tor (itself referred to repeatedly as the domain of the Welsh king of the Welsh Otherworld (Annwn), Gwyn-ap-Nudd), in hopes of seeing the Grail. A Glastonbury Romance is also the first of several novels by Powys that reflect his growing interest in Welsh mythology, the others are Maiden Castle (1935), Morwyn (1937), Owen Glendower (1941), and Porius (1951). The Welshman Owen Evans, one of the novel's main characters, introduces the idea that the Grail has a Welsh (Celtic), pagan pre-Christian origin.

== Genre: Romance ==
The novel's title "points to a distinction between romance and novel", and, in his Autobiography, Powys describes Walter Scott's romances, as "by far the most powerful literary influence of my life". Scott defines the romance as "a fictitious narrative in prose or verse; the interest of which turns upon marvellous and uncommon incidents", in contrast to mainstream novels which realistically depict the state of a society. These works frequently, but not exclusively, take the form of the historical novel. The following definition of the word "romance" is also serves describes some of the characteristic elements of the romance: "the character or quality that makes something appeal strongly to the imagination, and sets it apart from the mundane; an air, feeling, or sense of wonder, mystery, and remoteness from everyday life; redolence or suggestion of, or association with, adventure, heroism, chivalry, etc.; mystique, glamour" (OED). This definition is associated with the Romantic movement, as well as to the medieval romance tradition.

== God-like omniscience ==
In a letter written just after he had completed A Glastonbury Romance Powys describes how it differs from his previous novel,Wolf Solent, because it does not,"strain the whole business through one character ... but jumps about boldly and shamelessly from one person's thoughts to another's. David A. Cook calls this "an awesome authorial omniscience" that aspires "to the cosmic consciousness of God. The "author-god" enters the consciousness not only of an array of human characters but assigns "souls" to the sun, moon, and the earth. Keith 2010, p. 38For example, "the thoughts of the earth mother throbbed with ... unappeasable jealousy". Powys also includes "the feelings of a tree" and "the secret life motion a louse". The lives of multiple characters and their individual perspectives are followed. The main stories involve, Philip Crow, John Crow, Sam Dekker, John Geard, and Owen Evans, with numerous critics describing them, other than Philip Crow, as "Powy-heroes", that is characters who reflect "a dominant psychological bias in the author". H. P. Collins describes John Crow as "a quite undisguised projection of John Cowper", while Sam Dekker embodies "John Cowper's suppressed evangelism". Jocelyn Brooke likewise sees Owen Evans as "a projection of Powys the self-confessed sadist; and "Johnny Geard, the methodist messiah ... is none other than the eccentric, 'dithyrambic' lecturer to American Women's Clubs".

Three women are also especially significant, John Crow's wife Mary (née Crow), Evans's wife, Cordelia Geard, and Persephone Spear (née Crow)(see, W. J. Keith for Cordelia and Mary, and Glen Cavaliero for Persephone). Also important is Mad Bet's plot to murder John Crow. But this does not exhaust the list of individual stories and the novel offers different perspectives and "numerous political and religious views jostle for attention, with none being privileged over others"; and, there is also, a wide spectrum of social classes ... age groups ... and love relationships ... [including] "a remarkably varied array of homoerotic attractions and liaisons".

There is in addition the question of the role of the novel's narrator and the extent to which he is to be identified with the author. Generally critics tend to follow "the convention of calling the narrator 'Powys'", Academics such as Wilson Knight, George Steiner, and John Bayley "have heard one voice in [Powys's] novels, that of Powys himself". Other critics, however, emphasise "the artistry of Powys", that his novels are "deliberate literary works". Charles Lock, for example, following ideas formulated by the Russian critic Mikhail Bakhtin, emphasizes the polyphonic or multiple-voiced nature of A Glastonbury Romance: "The characters' voices are not subject to the author's voice, bur all speak on equal terms". The narrator is not Powys, "Even when the narrator voices opinions known th have been held by Powys ... he must not be taken 'literally' or too seriously", his "voice [is] on the same plane as all other voices in the book Powys's narrator, according to Lock, is "unreliable, protean, deceptive, ambiguous, and Zany". However, while W. J. Keith accepts that Powys gives characters "arguments that may be very different from his own", he contends that this does not "stifle all 'omniscient' authorial opinion", as Lock, following Bakhtin, suggests, because the author "exerts ultimate authority".

== Significance of the settings ==
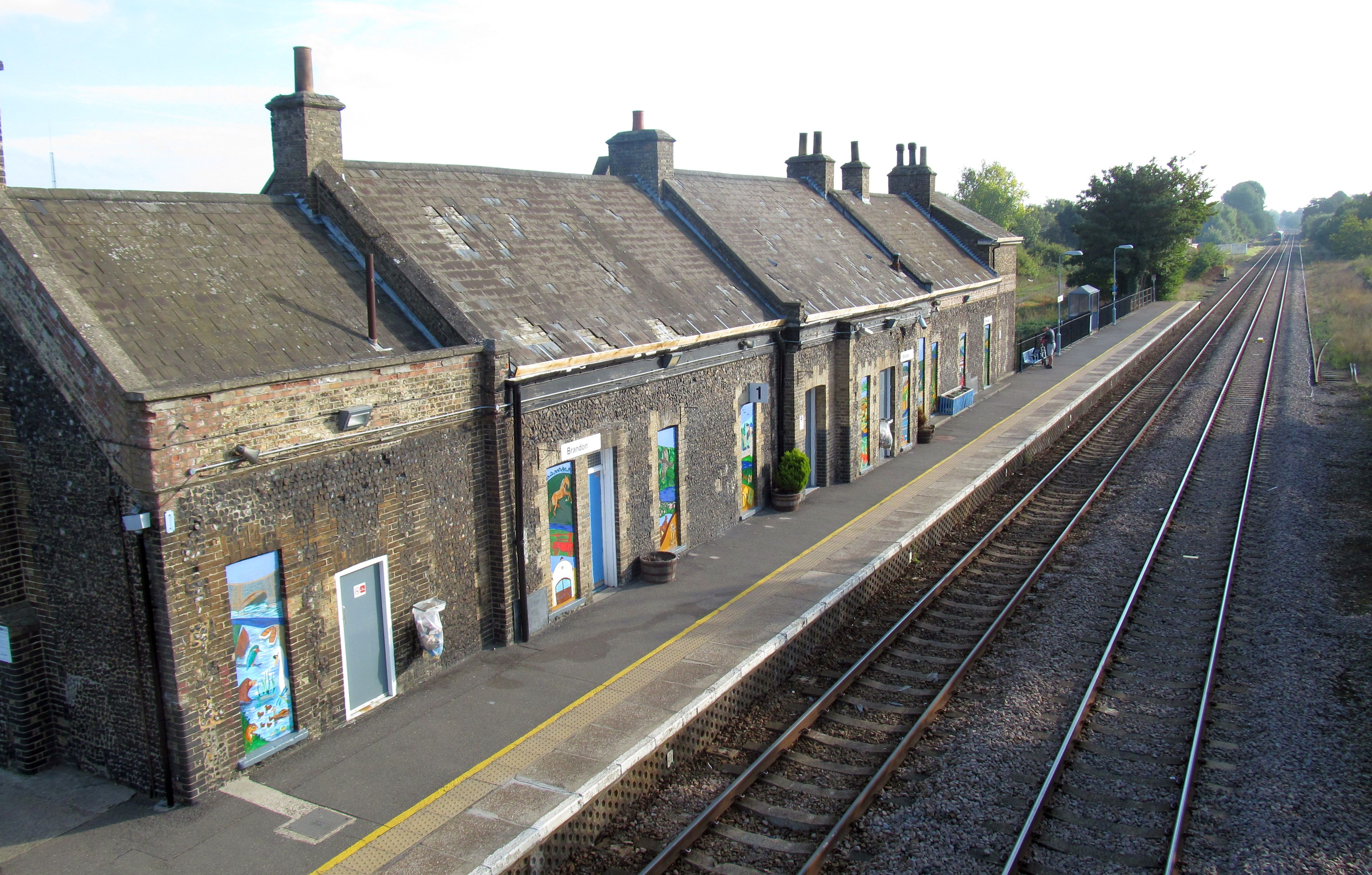
Brandon railway station, Suffolk, where John Crow arrives on the 5th of March

Setting has a central role in A Glastonbury Romance and Roland Mathias suggests that Powys "is less interested in the clash of character than in the ethos of place. In his "Authors Review" of 1932 Powys names the hero of his novel as "Glastonbury herself", and in answer to the question as to how "can a mere place or region, have a personality?" he answers "I cannot tell. But I know that it has one!" However, the novel's first two chapters take place in Norfolk, and the third is at the site of the ancient stone circle, Stonehenge. Another important scene, at least in earlier uncut versions of the novel, takes place in the Wookey Hole Caves, some 13 kilometres (8 mi) from Glastonbury on the edge of the Mendip Hills. Geographically Norfolk and the country surrounding Glastonbury are similar, that is both are low-lying, reclaimed marshland, though the town was formerly an island and has three prominent hills, Chalice Hill, Glastonbury Tor, and Wearyall or Wirral Hill, each of which has a role in the novel.

Central to the novel is the contrast Powys makes between the inhabitants from the two main settings: On the one hand, the people of Norfolk, in particular the members of the Crow family, are described descendants of Danish invaders, "who rode roughshod over the sacred mythologies of Celtic Britain". Powys uses Dane and Norman interchangeably. (Note: In fact the Dane Cnut conquered England in 1016. He established earldoms based on the former kingdoms of Northumbria, Mercia and East Anglia, but initially administered Wessex personally. At some time after 1020 the earldom of Wessex was conferred on English-born Godwin (Emma Mason, The House of Godwine: The History of Dynasty. Hambledon Press, 2003. p. 33). Thereafter, Godwin rose to become, in King Edward's time, the most powerful man in the kingdom. Upon Godwin's death in 1053, the earldom passed to his son, who became King Harold II in 1066, and died at the Battle of Hastings the same year.His death marked the end of Anglo-Saxon rule over England and Wessex ceased to exist after 1066 Kelly DeVries, The Norwegian Invasion of England in 1066. Boydell & Brewer Ltd, 1999, p. 230 et seq.. See also History of England#England under the Danes and the Norman conquest) The inhabitants of Glastonbury are descended from Saxons and earlier Celtic and neolithic people. The fact that Owen Evans and others have Celtic, Welsh ancestry is important. Geard has a "long line of Saxon ancestors, preserving their distinct identity under centuries of Norman tyranny". He also emphasizes that King Arthur was a Saxon king. Geard is attempting "to cast out the Invaders ... [who] attempted to rule since the Battle of Hastings" in 1066. Norfolk, represented by the Crow family, stands as "a kind of touchstones of sanity and a recalcitrant resistance to the dominance of the supernatural" that characterizes Glastonbury.

An important part of the setting is also the multiple layers of history, legend, and mythology associated with Glastonbury. In addition to Danish and Norman invasions, there is the association of Glastonbury in legend with Christ through Joseph of Arithamathea, with King Arthur, with earlier Welsh or Celtic mythology, and Neolithic aboriginals.

John Crow by chance meets the mythology obsessed Owen Evans at Stonehenge, on his journey from Norfolk to Glastonbury. John "is greatly affected by" the ancient site, which, for him is "no dead ruin like Glastonbury", rejecting Evans's idea that was "a Druid's Temple". as he refuses "'to delegate' to any interpreter, any priest". John Crow believes that is possible to worship a stone as a god and rejects "all the mysterious cult secrets that Evans's erudite imaginative need collected, just as he later rejects the mysteries of Glastonbury".

The Wookey Hole Caves, owned by the industrialist Philip Crow, "hold a malefic function" in opposition to what Glastonbury represents. Likewise, Philip's ambition, is to modernise Glastonbury in opposition to his antagonist Geard's planned religious revival. Philip is associated with mining, a factory, flying, and plans to electrify Wookey Hole, "the caves of the Druids".

Eight pages of chapter 8, "Wookey Hole", were removed when the novel was reprinted in 1955, and some shorter cuts were made to earlier reprints in 1933. In the full version, a mythological parallel is established between Philip's descent into the Caves with Persephone Spear and the god Pluto's (Note: Pluto, Plouton, was one of several euphemistic names for Hades (Hansen, Classical Mythology, pp. 162 and 182, citing Homer, Iliad 9.158–159. Plato says that people prefer the name Plouton, "giver of wealth," because the name of Hades is fear-provoking (Plato, Cratylus 403a; Glenn R. Morrow, Plato's Cretan City: A Historical Interpretation of the Laws (Princeton University Press, 1993), pp. 452–453). The name was understood as referring to "the boundless riches of the earth, both the crops on its surface—he was originally a god of the land—and the mines hidden within it" (Fernando Navarro Antolin, Lygdamus: Corpus Tibullianum III.1–6, Lygdami Elegiarum Liber (Brill, 1996), pp. 145–146). As a lord of abundance or riches, Pluto expresses the aspect of the underworld god that was positive, symbolized in art by the "horn of plenty" (cornucopia),(Charlotte R. Long, The Twelve Gods of Greece and Rome (Brill, 1987), p. 179; Phyllis Pray Bober, "Cernunnos: Origin and Transformation of a Celtic Divinity," American Journal of Archaeology 55 (1951), p. 28, examples in Greek and Roman art in note 98; Hewitt, "The Propitiation of Zeus," p. 65) by means of which Plouton is distinguished from the gloomier Hades (Tsagalis, Inscribing Sorrow, pp. 101–102; Morrow, Plato's Cretan City, pp. 452–453; John J. Hermann, Jr., "Demeter-Isis or the Egyptian Demeter? A Graeco-Roman Sculpture from an Egyptian Workshop in Boston" in Jahrbuch des Deutschen Archäologischen Instituts 114 (1999), p. 88). (Wikipedia)) descent into his underworld kingdom, with the goddess Demeter's daughter Persephone. The legend of Wookey Hole involves a witch being changed into a stalactite by a monk's holy water. In the full version, the "'phallic' formations of the cave" are described as " 'memorials' of the Witch of Wookey's 'monstrous encounters' ", which Penny Smith suggests are a reference here to the "myth of the castrating Mother" and Smith links this to the "cult of Cybele and her son Attis". Philip, however, experience in the Cave " 'a sensation of power ... beyond anything he had ever known' ". Paul Cheshire notes that this energy is "phallic", and he points to "three superhuman forces operating on Philip". Firstly "the umbilical nerve within him vibrating in response to the nerves of the Great Mother" secondly "the [divine-diabolic] First Cause ... and [thirdly] ... Christ ... operating 'against him' ". Later Geard visits Philip's "kingdom below the earth", where, according to Paul Cheshire, "the Witch" strikes "a 'dolorous blow' against [his] Grail project", when he falls asleep and misses making "his great speech".

- Glastonbury Tor

A hill near Glastonbury topped by the roofless St Michael's Tower. The Tor is mentioned in Celtic mythology, particularly in myths linked to King Arthur, and has several other enduring mythological and spiritual associations. The Tor seems to have been called Ynys yr Afalon (meaning "The Isle of Avalon") by the Britons and is believed by some, including the 12th and 13th century writer Gerald of Wales, to be the Avalon of Arthurian legend. The Tor has been associated with the name Avalon, and identified with King Arthur, since the alleged discovery of his and Queen Guinevere's neatly labelled coffins in 1191, recounted by Gerald of Wales. Author Christopher L. Hodapp asserts in his book The Templar Code for Dummies that Glastonbury Tor is one of the possible locations of the Holy Grail, because it is close to the monastery that housed the Nanteos Cup.

With the 19th century resurgence of interest in Celtic mythology, the Tor became associated with Gwyn ap Nudd, the first Lord of the Otherworld (Annwn) and later King of the Fairies. The Tor came to be represented as an entrance to Annwn or to Avalon, the land of the fairies. The Tor is supposedly a gateway into "The Land of the Dead (Avalon)".

- Chalice Hill

Chalice Hill, a small hill next to Glastonbury Tor and situated near the summit is Chalice Well, a natural spring, also known as the Red Spring. Wells often feature in Welsh and Irish mythology as gateways to the spirit world. One legend is that Chalice Well marks the site where Joseph of Arimathea placed the chalice that had caught the drops of Christ's blood at the Crucifixion, linking the Well to the wealth of speculation surrounding the existence of the Holy Grail.

- Wearyall or Wirrall Hill

According to legend, Joseph of Arimathea visited Glastonbury with the Holy Grail and thrust his staff into Wearyall Hill, which then grew into the original thorn tree. The original tree has been propagated several times, with one tree growing at Glastonbury Abbey and another in the churchyard of the Church of St John. The "original" Glastonbury thorn was cut down and burned as a relic of superstition during the English Civil War, and one was planted on Wearyall Hill in 1951 to replace it.

== Myths and legends of Glastonbury ==
=== Influences ===
Not only is A Glastonbury Romance concerned with the legend that Joseph of Arimathea brought the Grail, a vessel containing the blood of Christ, to the town, but the further tradition that King Arthur was buried there. Powys's wide reading in the literature relating to the Grail, King Arthur, fertility ritual, and Celtic mythology shaped the mythological ideas that underlie this novel. This includes John Rhys's Studies in the Arthurian Legend, the works of the Cambridge classical scholars, Jane Harrison, Francis Cornford, and Gilbert Murray, Roger Loomis on the Fisher King and W. E. Mead on Merlin. In addition Alfred Nutt "on the Celtic version" of the Grail Legend. However, "it was Jessie Weston's controversial theories of the Grail's origins ... that particularly absorbed him".

In writing this novel Powys was also clearly influenced by both James Joyce's Ulysses and T. S. Eliot's The Waste Land. Just as Joyce established a series of parallels between Homer's Odyssey and his novel, Powys used the Grail as "a peg upon which to hang his huge narrative". In a letter to Kenneth Hopkins, Powys comments "There is all the way through the book a constant undercurrent of secret references to the Grail Legends, various incidents playing roles parallel to those in the old romances of the Grail". Eliot in his first note to his poem attributes the title to Jessie Weston's book on the Grail legend, From Ritual to Romance. The allusion is to the wounding of the Fisher King and the subsequent sterility of his lands; and to the restoring the King and make his lands fertile again.

=== Island of Avalon ===
Though no longer an island the high conical bulk of Glastonbury Tor had been surrounded by marsh prior to the draining of fenland in the Somerset Levels. In ancient times, Ponter's Ball Dyke would have guarded the only entrance to the island. The Romans eventually built another road to the island. Glastonbury's earliest name in Welsh was the Isle of Glass, which suggests that the location was at one point seen as an island. At the end of the 12th century, Gerald of Wales wrote in De principis instructione:

What is now known as Glastonbury was, in ancient times, called the Isle of Avalon. It is virtually an island, for it is completely surrounded by marshlands. In Welsh it is called Ynys Afallach, which means the Island of Apples and this fruit once grew in great abundance. After the Battle of Camlann, a noblewoman called Morgan, later the ruler and patroness of these parts as well as being a close blood-relation of King Arthur, carried him off to the island, now known as Glastonbury, so that his wounds could be cared for. Years ago the district had also been called Ynys Gutrin in Welsh, that is the Island of Glass, and from these words the invading Saxons later coined the place-name "Glastingebury".

=== Holy Grail ===
The Holy Grail is a treasure that serves as an important motif in Arthurian literature. Different traditions describe it as a cup, dish or stone with miraculous powers that provides eternal youth or sustenance in infinite abundance, often in the custody of the Fisher King. The term "holy grail" is often used to denote an elusive object or goal that is sought after for its great significance.

A "grail", wondrous but not explicitly holy, first appears in Perceval, le Conte du Graal, an unfinished romance written by Chrétien de Troyes around 1190. Chrétien's story attracted many continuators, translators and interpreters in the later 12th and early 13th centuries, including Wolfram von Eschenbach, who perceived the Grail as a stone. In the late 12th century, Robert de Boron wrote in Joseph d'Arimathie that the Grail was Jesus's vessel from the Last Supper, which Joseph of Arimathea used to catch Christ's blood at the crucifixion. Thereafter, the Holy Grail became interwoven with the legend of the Holy Chalice, the Last Supper cup, a theme continued in works such as the Lancelot-Grail cycle and consequently Le Morte d'Arthur.

Joseph of Arimathea was, according to all four canonical gospels, the man who assumed responsibility for the burial of Jesus after Ηis crucifixion. A number of stories that developed during the Middle Ages connect him with Glastonbury. and also with the Holy Grail legend.

Powys lists the forms that the Grail has been known "in those parts for five thousand years": "a cauldron, a horn, a krater, a mwys (basket), (Note: It is told that Gwyddno Garanhir ("Long-shank") possessed a hamper (mwys) which would multiply food: if one was to put food for one man in the basket and open it again, the food was found to be increased a hundredfold.) a well, (Note: This is "unprescedended in traditional Grail literature ... so JCP was probably thinking ... of the Chalice Well". W. J. Keith, p. 132.) a kernos, (Note: is a pottery ring or stone tray to which are attached several small vessels for holding offerings. Its unusual design is described in literary sources, which also list the ritual ingredients it might contain. Jacquelyn Collins-Clinton, A Late Antique Shrine of Liber Pater at Cosa (Brill, 1976), pp. 29 –30. passim The kernos was used primarily in the cults of Demeter and Kore, and of Cybele and Attis. Phillippe Borgeaud, Mother of the Gods: From Cybele to the Virgin Mary (Johns Hopkins University Press, 1996, English translation 2004)) a platter, a cup, and even a nameless stone". W. J. Keith comments that cauldrons "are an especially common feature of Celtic literature, and include "Bran's cauldron of rebirth ... and Ceridwen's cauldron of inspiration", but especially the "Cauldron of the Head of Hades" (Cauldron of Yr Echwyd), which is "the object of Arthur's quest in ... "The Spoils of Annwn" (Preiddau Annwn)".

In the "Preface" to the 1955 edition of A Glastonbury Romance Powys describes the Grail as referring "us to things beyond itself and to things beyond words", and that it is "older than Christianity", "older than the orbits of the stars", "a symbol of beyond-life", a symbol of "a lapping up of one perfect drop of noon-day happiness". For Geard it is "a fragment of the Absolute", "a little nucleus of eternity".

==== Fisher King ====
In Arthurian legend, the Fisher King also known as the Wounded King or Maimed King is the last in a long bloodline charged with keeping the Holy Grail. Versions of the original story vary widely, but he is always wounded in the legs or groin and incapable of standing. All he is able to do is fish in a small boat on the river near his castle, Corbenic, and wait for some noble who might be able to heal him by asking a certain question. In later versions, knights travel from many lands to try to heal the Fisher King, but only the chosen can accomplish the feat. This is achieved by Percival alone in the earlier stories; he is joined by Galahad and Bors in the later ones..

The Fisher King appears first in Chrétien de Troyes' Perceval, the Story of the Grail in the late 12th century, but the character's roots may lie in Celtic mythology. He may be derived more or less directly from the figure of Brân the Blessed in the Mabinogion. In the Second Branch, Bran has a cauldron that can resurrect the dead (albeit imperfectly; those thus revived cannot speak) which he gives to the king of Ireland as a wedding gift for him and Bran's sister Branwen. Later, Bran wages war on the Irish and is wounded in the foot or leg, and the cauldron is destroyed. He asks his followers to sever his head and take it back to Britain, and his head continues talking and keeps them company on their trip. The group lands on the island of Gwales, where they spend 80 years in a castle of joy and abundance, but finally they leave and bury Bran's head in London. This story has analogues in two other important Welsh texts: the Mabinogion tale "Culhwch and Olwen", in which King Arthur's men must travel to Ireland to retrieve a magical cauldron, and the poem The Spoils of Annwn, which speaks of a similar mystical cauldron sought by Arthur in the otherworldly land of Annwn.

The injury is a common theme in the telling of the Grail Quest. Although some iterations have two kings present, one or both are injured, most commonly in the thigh. The wound is sometimes presented as a punishment, usually for philandering. In Parzival, specifically, the king is injured by the bleeding lance as punishment for taking a wife, which was against the code of the "Grail Guardians". In some early story lines, Percival asking the Fisher King the healing question cures the wound. The nature of the question differs between Perceval and Parzival, but the central theme is that the Fisher King can be healed only if Percival asks "the question".

The location of the wound is of great importance to the legend. In most medieval stories, the mention of a wound in the groin or more commonly the "thigh" (such as the wounding of the ineffective suitor in Lanval from the Lais of Marie de France) is a euphemism for the physical loss of or grave injury to one's penis. In medieval times, acknowledging the actual type of wound was considered to rob a man of his dignity, thus the use of the substitute terms "groin" or "thigh", although any informed medieval listener or reader would have known exactly the real nature of the wound. Such a wound was considered worse than actual death because it signaled the end of a man's ability to function in his primary purpose: to propagate his line. In the instance of the Fisher King, the wound negates his ability to honour his sacred charge.

==== Characters who see the Grail ====
There is some disagreement amongst critics with regard to the how characters relate to the Grail. Glen Cavaliero states that "Persephone, Sam, and Evans are all seeking the Grail", but that "only the single-minded ones, Sam and Mary, are allowed to see it", though he also states that "Bloody Johnny [Geard] lives as if the Grail were his loving cup – earlier Cavaliero denied that Geard was "seeking the Grail Evans "pursues the Grail experience relentlessly, for release from his masochistic prison of perverted sexuality". W.J. Keith, however, claims that the only "unequivocal Grail-experiences in the romance" are "Sam Dekker's and Mr Geard's just before his death". In addition, Keith, suggests that "various individuals are rewarded with experiences that, if not of the Grail itself, are none the less preternatural, and often spiritually fulfilling". This includes Cordelia Geard's visit to Chalice Hill, "John Crow's vision of Arthur's sword", and Mary Crow's ecstatic experience upon seeing "something that seemed more blood-red than sunlight hit ... the great broken arch" of the Abbey ruins. The Grail even seems to enter the mind of its arch-enemy Philip Crow, in the form of grail-dream or nightmare. To this should be added Geard's daughters Cordelia and Crummie, who "act as grail-bearers to Evans and Sam respectively ... and the "'dark' grail bearer ... Mad Bet".

=== King Arthur ===
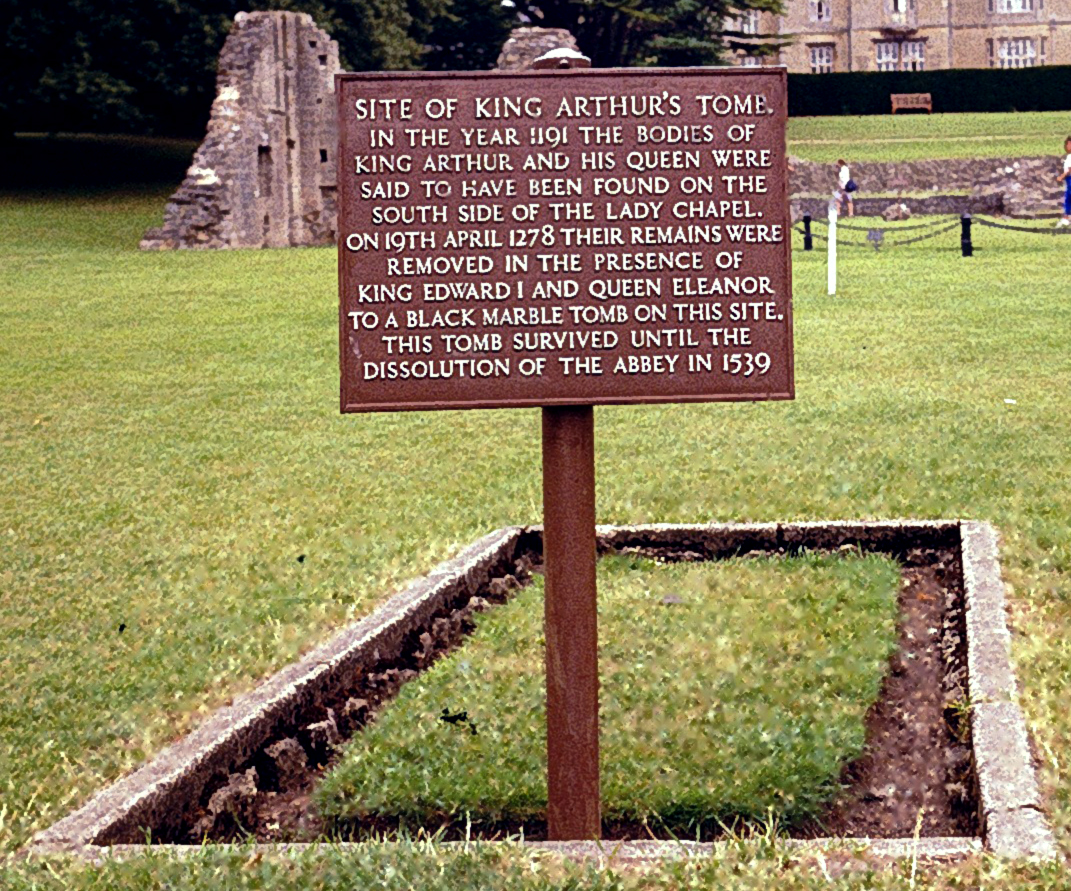
Site of King Arthur and Queen Guinevere's purported tomb beneath the high altar

The legendary Arthur developed as a figure of international interest largely through the popularity of Geoffrey of Monmouth's fanciful and imaginative 12th-century Historia Regum Britanniae (History of the Kings of Britain). In some Welsh and Breton tales and poems that date from before this work, Arthur appears either as a great warrior defending Britain from human and supernatural enemies or as a magical figure of folklore, sometimes associated with the Welsh otherworld Annwn (see reference to Gwyn ap Nudd above). How much of Geoffrey's Historia (completed in 1138) was adapted from such earlier sources, rather than invented by Geoffrey himself, is unknown. According to Geoffrey in the Historia, and much subsequent literature which he inspired, King Arthur was taken to Avalon in hope that he could be saved and recover from his mortal wounds following the tragic Battle of Camlann. Much of the work appears to be derived from Gildas's 6th-century De Excidio et Conquestu Britanniae, Bede's 8th-century Historia ecclesiastica gentis Anglorum, the 9th-century Historia Brittonum ascribed to Nennius, the 10th-century Annales Cambriae, medieval Welsh genealogies (such as the Harleian Genealogies) and king-lists, the poems of Taliesin, the Welsh tale Culhwch and Olwen, and some of the medieval Welsh saints' lives,

Around 1190, monks at Glastonbury Abbey claimed to have discovered the bones of Arthur and his wife Guinevere. The discovery of the burial is described by chroniclers, notably Gerald, as being just after King Henry II's reign when the new abbot of Glastonbury, Henry de Sully, commissioned a search of the abbey grounds. At a depth of 5 m (16 ft), the monks were said to have discovered an unmarked tomb with a massive treetrunk coffin and, also buried, a lead cross bearing the inscription:

Hic jacet sepultus inclitus rex Arturius in insula Avalonia.
("Here lies entombed the renowned king Arthur in the island of Avalon.")

=== Merlin ===
Links between King Arthur's magician Merlin, and Glastonbury are “practically non-existent”, but for the legend that King Arthur was buried there. However, Merlin is important in the lives of two of the novel's main characters, Owen Evans and John Geard. Evans is writing a life of Merlin and believes that hidden in the ancient Welsh grail myths is a spiritual wisdom that will enable him to free himself from the nightmare of his sadistic obsession and find happiness (A Glastonbury Romance, p, 151). Geard spends a night in a room at Marks Court associated with fear and death, because it was where Merlin returned and punished King Mark's crimes by turning him into "a pinch of thin grey dust" (p. 406). After struggling within fear, upon hearing the voice of Merlin "Geard reaches out to comfort the disconsolate ghost ... and from then on does in a sense become Merlin himself". C. A. Coates comments that after this experience Geard "has achieved something in the psychic sphere and established his right to be called a magician". This combined with the legend about the Holy grail containing drops of Christ's blood, gives Geard the Christ-like power of curing Tithie Petherton of her cancer, and bringing an apparently dead boy back to life (pp. 707, 893-4).

In his Autobiography Powys states that "my dominant life-illusion was that I was, or at least would eventually be, a magician". Later, after describing how reading Thomas Hardy helped him overcome his sadistic thoughts, Powys says that he felt himself "to be what the great Magician Merlin was before he met his 'Belle Dame sans Merci' " (Autobiography, p. 309). Merlin again appears in Morwyn (1937), and as Myrddin in Porius: A Romance of the Dark Ages (1951), while in Owen Glendower (1941), Glendower is presented as a magician by Powys, following Shakespeare's suggestion, in Henry IV: Part 1 (III.i. 530), There is also, earlier, in Wolf Solent (1929) reference to Christie's mother being Welsh and claiming descent from Merlin.

=== Christ ===
One of the legends that Powys make use of is that Joseph of Arimathea brought the Grail, a vessel containing the blood of Christ, to Glastonbury.

With regard to Powys's use of Christ, Glen Cavaliero, comments that: The figure of Christ, although a powerful influence in the spiritual world of Glastonbury, is ambiguous in character and means different things to different people. Christ is associated mainly with three of the novels major characters: Own Evans, John Geard, and Sam Dekker. A more minor role is played by Sam's father, Matt, vicar of Glastonbury, who is based on Powys's father and represents traditional Anglican beliefs.

A central episode in the novel involves Owen Evans's highly realistic portrayal of Christ's suffering on the cross in the pageant scene. Earlier Evans had hoped that he could free himself from his sadism by discovering the "ancient Cauldron of Celtic myth", one form that the grail takes, however, because this quest fails, he decides to "seek" to expiate "his would-be crimes" by emulating Christ's suffering on the cross. But, "he exults in his agony" and "[i]t not only failed to purge him of his vice" but "[h]is sado-maschochistic orgy" "aids in its gratification".

Sam Dekker believes "that Christ is a God" who opposes " 'the cruelty of the great Creator-God' " – is "the enemy of God", "like Lucifer". This leads him to renounce "the world, the devil and the flesh", to give up his adulterous love affair with Nell Zoyland and endeavour to live the life of a saint. Such a "puritanical and neurotic attitude is condemned in the novel" and Evans sees this as form of auto sadism. However, "[it] is the existence of pain which has caused Sam, in his hypersensitive sympathy, to reject the whole life force". Subsequently Sam's sensitivity to nature" is "greatly intensified". The "growth of sensitive awareness suddenly [becomes a] mystical vision", with Sam's Grail experience. Following this–and Sam giving Mr Twig an enema–"he no longer has scruples about making love to Nell". She, however, has gone back to her husband.

John Geard's "intention is to inaugurate a new religion", a "Fifth Gospel", by showing "'the world ... that the real Grail still existed in Glastonbury' ". For Geard the Grail and Christ's Blood have made Glastonbury a focus of spiritual force. Geard's "passive reciprocity" to "the psychic power" of the Grail "gives him powers he can use positively". However, in the "Preface" to the 1955 edition of the novel, Powys notes that "the Holy Grail" is "much older than Christianity" and it is on the night of Christ's Resurrection that he has his encounter with the spirit of Merlin, which creates "an essential link between himself and Merlin ... [and] unites pagan and Christian religion in a loose bond". Another pagan dimension is provided by the reference to Cybele, the Mother goddess, as well as the temple to the Neolithic goddess of fertility, in the final pages.

== Themes ==
In 1932 Powys said that, amongst other things, he wrote his Romance, "To express certain moral, philosophical and mystical ideas that seem to me unduly neglected in these days" ( In particular this is presented as a "psychic battle ... over the Grail ... between the 'forces of mystery,' and 'forces of reason' ([A Glastonbury Romance], 747)", or, in the words of Morine Krissdottir "a battle ... between the powers of science and the powers of magic", with Powys asking, what effect, if any, can myth myth have in the scientific twentieth century"? C. A. Coates describes it as "a novel in which the main element is the possibility of mystical experience" and that it is "one of the great mystical novels". While, for Glen Cavaliero, "Glastonbury as a place [is] uniquely constituted for revealing [Powys's] vision of reality. That vision might be described as a naturalizing of the supernatural, the incorporation into a single vision of two normally separate areas of experience". G. Wilson Knight, however, has a different focus, and sees A Glastonbury Romance as "the greatest study of evil that has ever been composed".

Kenneth Hopkins draws attention to the "half a dozen love stories ... each concerned with a different aspect of love". Along with which there is "love go God, love of ones neighbour, love of power, love of self, love of money; selfish or generous or hopeless or triumphant love".

=== Anthropomorphism ===
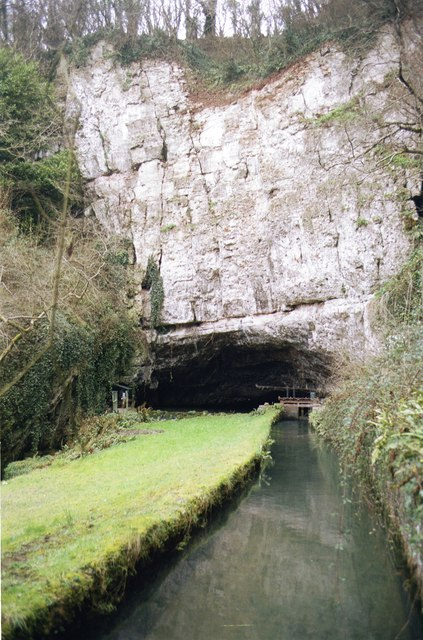
Wookey Hole

The novel also contains numerous examples of anthropomorphism, that is "the attribution of human characteristics or behavior to a god, animal, or object" (OED), reflecting Powys's belief that "there is nothing in the universe devoid of some mysterious element of consciousness ... whether animal, vegetable or mineral". This includes "certain astronomical powers or bodies" who are "possessed of sub-human or super-human consciousness", including "The Sun, the Moon, the Evening Star, the Milky Way, the Constellations". Also, in the first paragraph of the novel, there is reference to the dualism of the First Cause's "divine diabolical soul", the novel's equivalent to a Judeo-Christian God. In Powys's own word, from his "review" in 1932 of the novel, combining "God and the Devil".

== The Flood ==
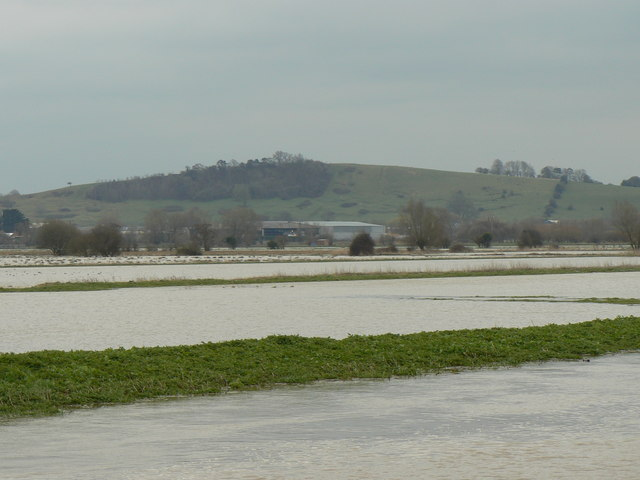
Flooded fields by the River Brue

There are three important elements in the novel's concluding chapter. The significance of the flood; then Geard's suicide and grail vision; and finally the allusion to the Earth Mother, Cybele.

There was an actual flood in the Somerset levels that surround Glastonbury in December 1929, just four months after Powys's visit, as well as one in 1919, when 70,000 acres (283 km^{2}) were inundated with sea water, poisoning the land for up to 7 years.

Charles Lock describes water as a central element in A Glastonbury Romance, which "begins in one aquatic landscape, Norfolk, and moves to another, Glastonbury". Lock sees water as signifying both "salvation and destruction" and equates it "in the symbolic pattern of novel ... [with] the female principle of life". This flood has generally been interpreted allegorically, especially in terms of the Biblical Flood, but also in terms of the Waste Land story. John Brebner, Wilson Knight, and others see it as a cleansing force, with Geoffrey West describing "the flood 'sweeping away both capitalist and communist'". Morine Krissdottir, however, sees the flood making "the Waste Land ... fertile again". W. J. Keith rejects this, because "salt water distinct from fresh water is the reverse of 'life-giving'". A quite different perspective on the flood is provided by J. P. Couch, who questions the Biblical paradigm observing that the land is low lying and therefore vulnerable to flooding, including from the sea and "has at least once" in living memory "already merged with the sea". Furthermore, it is believed that, in earlier times, Glastonbury had been an island.

=== Geard's suicide ===
Geard asks John Crow if he could conceive him "committing suicide out of love of life". Indeed his "suicide is not undertaken in weariness of spirit but as a continuation of his quest", because he believes that, following his death, he will meet "'A living Being, who might, or might not, be the Christ the churches worshipped'". W. J. Keith and others, see Geard's death "not as an act of self-destruction but as a Merlininesque 'Esplumoir'" that is, as Owen describes it, "'a sort of inspired suicide, a mysterious dying in order to live more fully'"; a "mystic Fourth Dimension, or Nirvanic apotheosis". The last we learn is that as Geard is dying "In calm inviolable peace ... he saw ... that nameless Object, that fragment of the Absolute, about which all his days he had been murmering".

=== Cybele ===
The "Divine Famine" is important in A Glastonbury Romance. The novel begins with reference to the "earth-mother", and ends "with a two-page celebration" of the Phrygian "Goddess of Earth" Cybele. Keith notes that though other references to the earth-mother are sparse, they "occur at fairly regular intervals", and Christine Bilodeau draws to attention to how Powys emphasizes the moon's symbolic relationship with the Feminine. Furthermore, it is "unusual spring tides" that causes the flooding.

In his Autobiography Powys refers to the "'Cybele to whom I have always prayed'", and, in his 1929 diary, he says that his "deepest Religious ritual is for the Mothersb- Cybele and Gaia and Demeter and Our Lady and Ceridwen the Welsh Demeter." W. j. Keith notes similarities "between the story of the Fisher King and various death-and-resurrections myths" that relate to Earth Goddesses, like Cybele, and their sons/lovers/consort. Attis is Cybele's consort, whose self-mutilation, death, and resurrection represents the fruits of the earth, which die in winter only to rise again in the spring. Geard drowns above " 'the spot where the ancient Lake Villagers had their temple to the ancient goddess of fertility'[Romance, 1955]". Jeremy Hooker suggests that Geard "returns himself to the waters of the primeval mother of all things".

== Reception ==
One of Powys's major novels, it was praised on publication by J. D. Beresford as "one of the greatest novels in the world". While Glen Cavaliero describes it "as Powys's most enthralling novel" despite "all its many and glaring faults".

In a review of the 1955 reprint, Roland Mathias describes Powys "as a strangely limited writer, fecund but narrow in his fecundity". He suggests that Powys "may not be a novelist at all, or less one than historian, philosopher and image-maker". Mathias finds Powys's characters unsatisfying: "It is, unfortunately, the plot that moves, not the characters. With few exceptions they do not develop". But, he notes,

It is not given to one writer in a generation to enjoy so embracing an imagination and to simulate life and beyond-life, to gather in preposterous and tender, and to go on being so interesting in himself that his fictions hardly matter.

However, though Jeremy Hooker sees all the major characters, as "reflections of a dominant psychological bias in the author", he argues that "Powys is, supremely, a master of personalities–of massive,self-consistent personalities. ... Evans is his creator's mouthpiece, but his ideas are consistent with his character".

A Glastonbury Romance was translated into French by Jean Queval, as Les enchantements de Glastonbury and published in 1975/6 (in four volumes) by Gallimard in their "Collection Du monde entier," with a preface by Catherine Lépront. In the German-speaking world, admirers included Hermann Hesse, Alfred Andersch, Hans Henny Jahnn, Karl Kerényi and Elias Canetti. It was published in Germany by Verlag Zweitausendeins, Frankfurt am Main, 2000, ISBN 3-86150-258-5; (Munich: Hanser, 1998).
