= Cyledr Wyllt =

Cyledr Wyllt (English: Cyledr the Wild) is a warrior and madman in Welsh mythology, known from the early Arthurian tale Culhwch and Olwen.

Cyledr is named as one of the warriors who joins Gwythyr ap Greidawl's failed attack on love rival Gwyn ap Nudd and is imprisoned by the enemy following the conflict, alongside his father Nwython and several others. Gwyn later murders Nwython and, subsequently, forces Cyledr to eat his father's heart. After sustaining such torture at his captive's hands, Cyledr went mad, thus earning the epithet Gwyllt.

Later in the tale, Arthur heads north to find Cyledr, and eventually catches him. Cyledr later assists Arthur in the hunting of Twrch Trwyth and is personally responsible for retrieving the shears from the boar.
