= Dormarch =

Welsh legendary hound

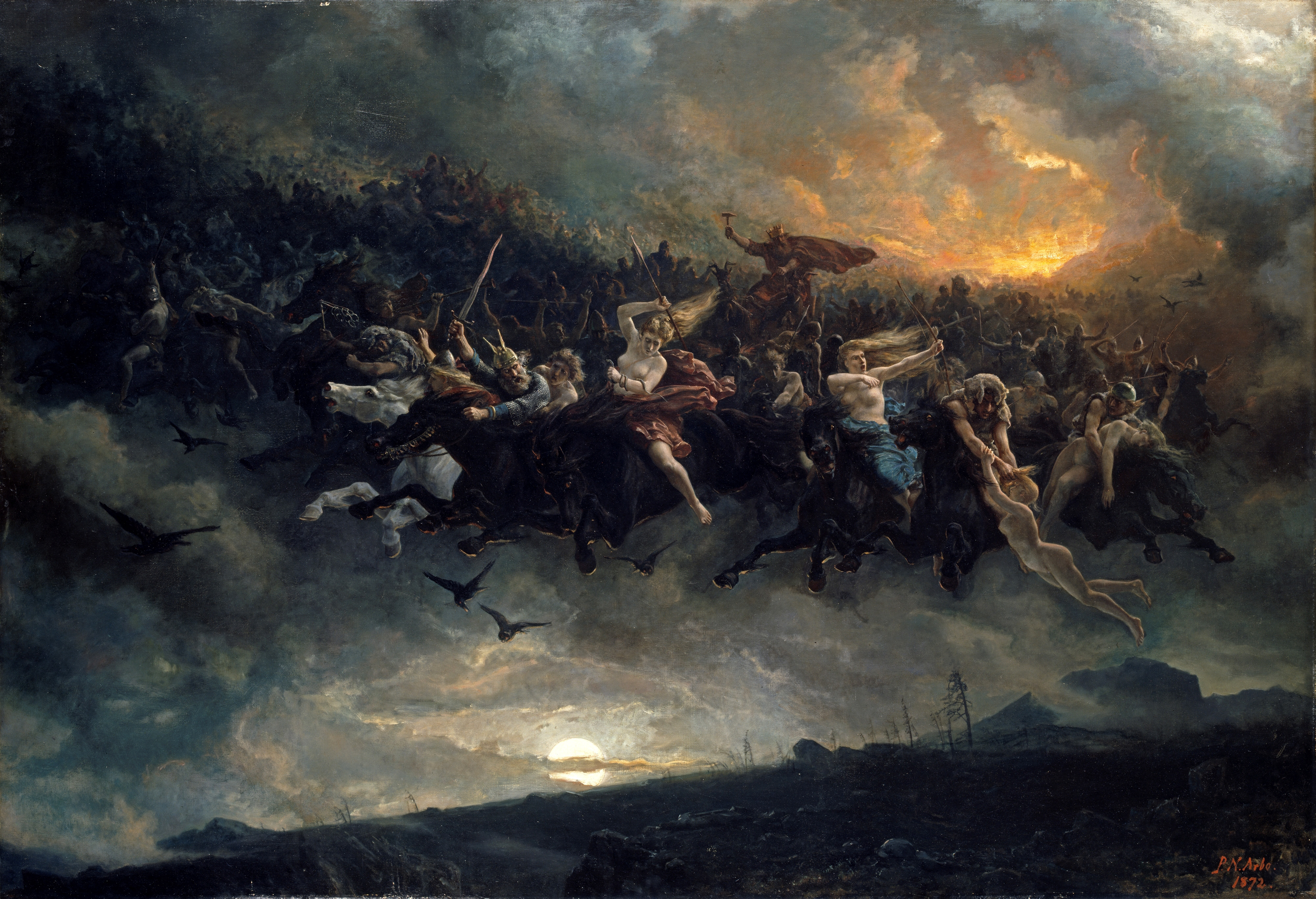
- The wild hunt of Odin

Creature information
- Other name: Dormath
- Grouping: Legendary creature
- Folklore: Welsh mythology

Origin
- Country: Wales
- Habitat: Clouds on mountain peaks

Dormarch or possibly Dormarth is a hound, normally used to assist hunters by tracking or chasing the animal that is being hunted, however in Welsh mythology Dormarch's master is Gwynn ap Nudd although formerly owned by Maelgwn Gwynedd, a 6th-century king of Gwynedd.

As king of the Tylwyth Teg or fairy folk, Gwynn ap Nudd was the ruler of Annwn, the Welsh equivalent of 'Heaven' and as such he is closely associated with the Wild Hunt where he is responsible for escorting newly deceased souls of British warriors from the battlefield to the afterlife.

== In myth ==
Dormarch has a single head, two front legs, and a body that narrows rapidly from the chest and terminates in three fish-like tails. The Dormarch's natural habitat is described in Welsh as being 'ar wybir', that is 'riding on the clouds' which haunt the mountain peaks.

== In literature ==
The Dialogue of Gwyn ap Nudd and Gwyddno Garanhir is found in the Black Book of Carmarthen describing how Gwyn ap Nudd meets Gwyddno, king of Cantre'r Gwaelod and converses with the king, boasting of his battlefield prowess and describing his role with the Wild Hunt, gathering the souls of fallen British warriors with the help of his hounds, thereby making Dormarch a member of the Cŵn Annwn, the 'Hounds of Annwn'.

Similar Wild Hunt hounds are found in other traditions, such as the Gabriel Hounds, Ratchets, Yell Hounds (Isle of Man), Herne the Hunter's hounds, etc.

One translation from the Black Book of Carmarthen gives :

"Handsome my dog, and round bodied,
And truly the best of dogs;
Dormath was he, which belonged to Maelgwyn.
Dormath with the ruddy nose! what a gazer
Thou art upon me because I notice
Thy wanderings on Gwibir Vynyd."

== In art ==
Dormarch is shown as a pictorial representation on page 97 of Evans' Black Book of Carmarthen in a Christianised form that reduces the canine attributes and instead draws from influences such as whales in Biblical legends, typically that of Jonah.

== Etymology ==
The meaning and exact form of the name "Dormarch" is uncertain because although written twice in this form by the scribe, the r has been erased at some stage, probably by another individual at a later stage. The form "Dormarth" has been interpreted as 'Death's door' although contradictory evidence exists and the word "mach" translates as 'a bail or surety'.

== See also ==
- Cavall
- Cerberus
- Wistman's Wood
