= Creiddylad =

Character in Welsh Arthurian folklore

- Parent: King Lludd

Creiddylad (also known as Creirddylad, Creurdilad, Creudylad or Kreiddylat), daughter of King Lludd, is a minor character in the early medieval Welsh Arthurian tale Culhwch ac Olwen.

== Role in Welsh tradition ==
Creiddylad, daughter of Lludd Silver Hand, is a lady living at the court of King Arthur. Considered to be the most beautiful girl in the British Isles, she is loved by two of Arthur's warriors: Gwythyr and Gwyn. Her rival suitors are thrust into conflict when Gwythyr abducts her from her father's house, to which Gwyn retaliates by kidnapping her from Gwythyr. Due to Arthur's intervention in the ensuing feud, the lady Creiddylad is returned to her father and an arrangement (a dihenydd, or "fate") is made that forces the adversaries to engage in single combat for the object of their love every May Day—while she is destined to remain with her father, unmarried—until a final battle on Judgement Day, which will determine who keeps her forever.

Creiddylad has been compared to the Greek springtime goddess Persephone, who is similarly abducted by an admirer (the underworld god Hades), rescued by an intervening character (Zeus), and reunited with her family (her mother Demeter), then cursed to repeat the experience every year. Here, the warrior duo's ritual battle for possession of Creiddylad may be understood as a version of the "Holly King" myth, possibly personifying the dynamic power struggle between summer and winter.

It is also observed that the name of Creiddylad's father (Lludd) and that of Gwyn's father (Nudd) are likely cognate, which suggests that the characters are different incarnations of the pan-Celtic deity Nodons. Hence, Gwyn is often described as Creiddylad's brother.

Additionally, she is sometimes confused with the goddess Creirwy, who is also referred to as the most beautiful girl in the world.

== In literature ==
=== Cordelia ===
Creiddylad is traditionally identified as the prototype of Geoffrey of Monmouth's pseudo-historical Queen Cordeilla, who is the source of William Shakespeare's heroine Cordelia (the youngest daughter of King Lear). This identification can be found in the 1833 edition of Encyclopædia Britannica. Lady Charlotte Guest, in the notes to her edition of The Mabinogion, which was first published in 1849, identifies Creiddylad, daughter of Lludd Llaw Ereint, with Cordelia, "daughter of Lludd, or Lear". In 1891, Sir John Rhys repeated this identification in Studies in the Arthurian Legend.

However, Geoffrey's Welsh translators failed to use the name Creiddylad in their Latin-to-Welsh translations of Historia Regum Britanniae, where he used Cordeilla. Further complicating the association, the legends surrounding Creiddylad and Cordelia are very different. Doubt has been cast on the linking of these two names, beyond "the string of consonants C-R-D-L".

=== John Cowper Powys ===
Novelist John Cowper Powys, as an admirer of both Guest's Mabinogion as well as the work of Sir John Rhys, was aware of the idea that Creiddylad can be identified with Geoffrey of Monmouth's Queen Cordelia. In A Glastonbury Romance, Cordelia Geard's name may indicate a mythological identification with Creiddylad, daughter of Lludd in The Mabinogion. In Powys's novel Porius: A Romance of the Dark Ages, which is set in Wales, Creiddylad, was the eponymous protagonist's giantess great-grandmother, as well as the name he gives to a young giantess whom he mates with.

== See also ==
- Fflur
