= Gwyn ap Nudd =

Welsh mythological figure

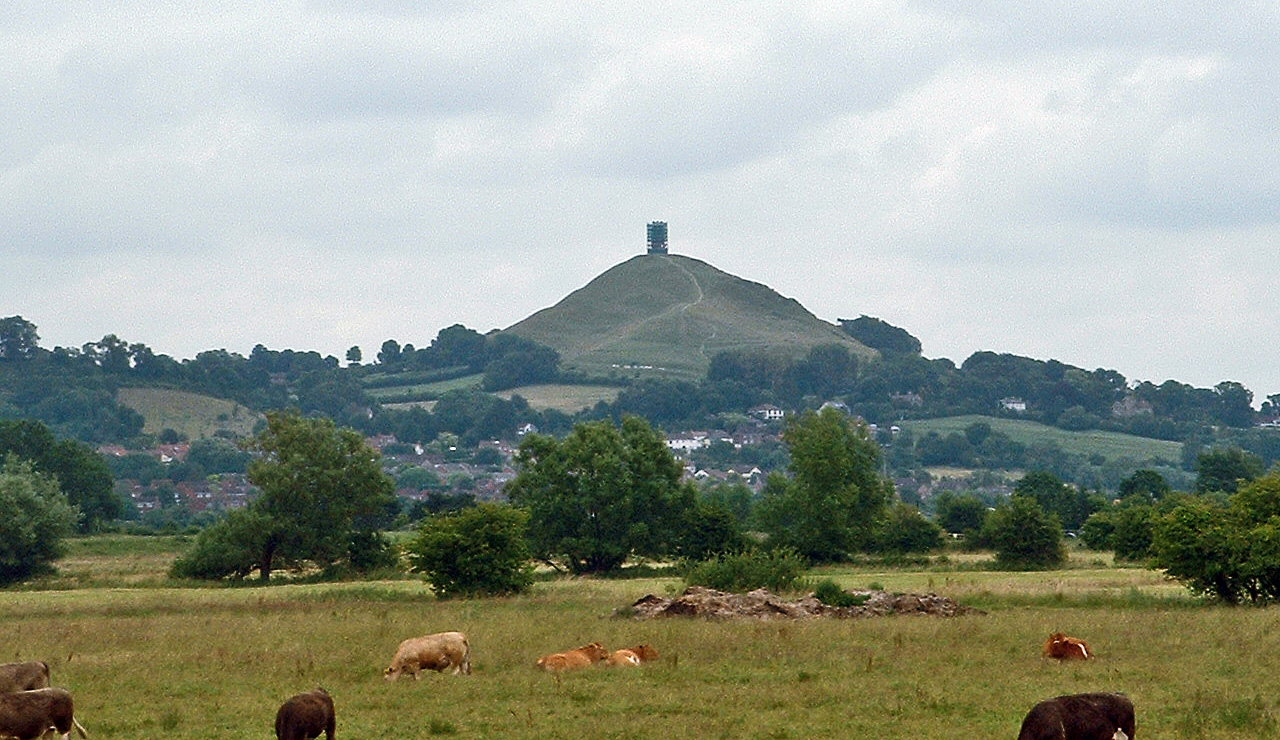
Gwyn ap Nudd is intimately associated with Glastonbury Tor.

Gwyn ap Nudd (Welsh pronunciation: [ˈɡwɨn ap ˈnɨːð], sometimes found with the antiquated spelling Gwynn ap Nudd) is a Welsh mythological figure, the king of the Tylwyth Teg or "fair folk" and ruler of the Welsh Otherworld, Annwn, and whose name means “Gwyn, son of Nudd”. Described later on as a great warrior with a "blackened face", Gwyn is intimately associated with the otherworld in medieval Welsh literature, and is associated with the international tradition of the Wild Hunt.

== Family ==
Gwyn is the son of Nudd and would thus be grandson to Beli Mawr and nephew of Arianrhod, Llefelys, Penarddun, Afallach, Gofannon, Nynniaw, Peibaw, and Caswallawn. Based on their shared patronymic (ap Nudd), his siblings include Edern, a warrior who appears in a number of Arthurian texts, and Owain ap Nudd, who is mentioned briefly in Geraint and Enid. In Culhwch and Olwen, Gwyn is the lover of Creiddylad, the daughter of Lludd, who may therefore be Gwyn's own sister, though that connection was not made by the medieval author(s) of Culhwch and Olwen.

== Legends ==
=== The abduction of Creiddylad ===
Gwyn plays a prominent role in the early Arthurian tale Culhwch and Olwen in which he abducts his sister Creiddylad from her betrothed, Gwythyr ap Greidawl. In retaliation, Gwythyr raised a great host against Gwyn, leading to a vicious battle between the two. Gwyn was victorious and, following the conflict, captured a number of Gwythyr's noblemen including Nwython and his son Cyledr. Gwyn would later murder Nwython, and force Cyledr to eat his father's heart. As a result of his torture at Gwyn's hands, Cyledr went mad, earning the epithet Wyllt.

After the intervention of Arthur, Gwyn and Gwythr agreed to fight for Creiddylad every May Day until Judgement Day. The warrior who was victorious on this final day would at last take the maiden. According to Culhwch and Olwen, Gwyn was "placed over the brood of devils in Annwn, lest they should destroy the present race".

=== As part of Arthur's retinue ===
Before he can win Olwen's hand, Culhwch ap Cilydd must complete a number of seemingly impossible tasks given to him by Olwen's father, the giant Ysbaddaden. One of these tasks is to retrieve the comb and scissors from the head of the vicious boar, Twrch Trwyth. As it is impossible to hunt the boar without Gwyn's aid, he is called upon to join Arthur and his retinue against Twrch Trwyth. During the hunt, he is mounted on Du y Moroedd, the only horse that can carry him. Both Gwyn and Gwythyr set out with Arthur to retrieve the blood of Orddu, witch of the uplands of hell.

=== Other exploits ===
Gwyn appears prominently in the medieval poem The Dialogue of Gwyn ap Nudd and Gwyddno Garanhir, found in the Black Book of Carmarthen. In this narrative—Gwyn, returning from battle, chances upon Gwyddno Garanhir, king of Cantre'r Gwaelod, and grants him his protection. Gwyn then relates his exploits on the battlefield before Bran the Blessed, Meurig ap Carreian, Gwendoleu ap Ceidaw and Llacheu ab Arthur. His skill in combat is extolled in this poem; he is described as "the hope of armies" and "hero of hosts" and, when asked from which region he comes, he simply replies: "I come from battle and conflict." The poem ends with Gwyn's proclamation:

I have been where the soldiers of Britain were slain.
From the east to the north
I am the escort of the grave.

I have been where the soldiers of Britain were slain.
From the east to the south
I am alive, they in death!

Gwyn apparently witnessed a "conflict" before Caer Vandwy, an otherworldly fortress mentioned in Preiddeu Annwfn.

=== Later traditions ===
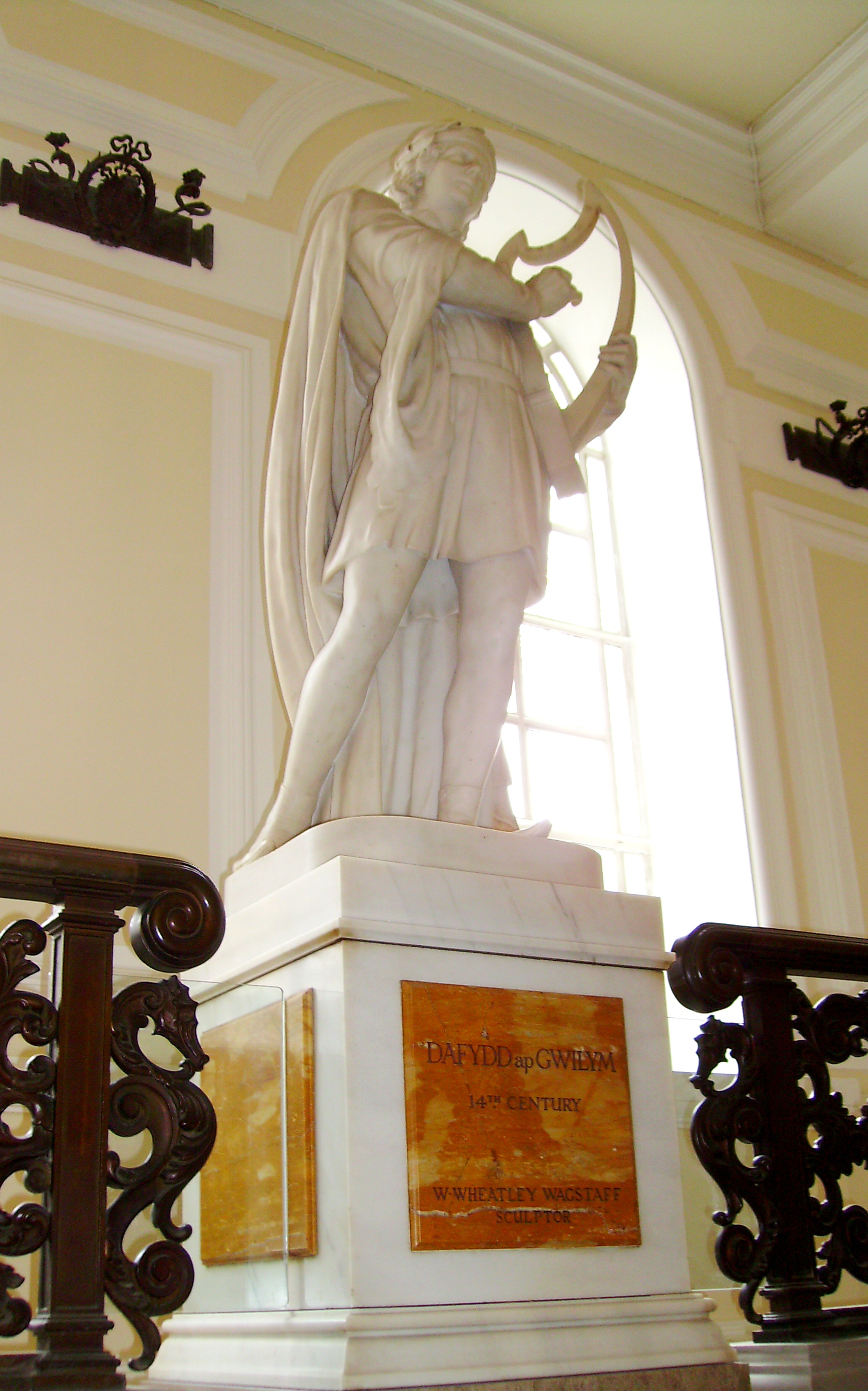
Sculpture of Dafydd ap Gwilym by W Wheatley Wagstaff at City Hall, Cardiff.

Over time, Gwyn's role would diminish and, in later folklore, he was regarded as the king of the Tylwyth Teg, the fairies of Welsh lore. He appears as a simpler figure in Buchedd Collen (The Life of Saint Collen), in which he and his retinue are vanquished from Glastonbury Tor with the use of holy water. According to the Speculum Christiani, a fourteenth century manuscript against divination, Welsh soothsayers would invoke Gwyn's name before entering woodlands, proclaiming: "to the king of Spirits, and to his queen— Gwyn ap Nudd, you who are yonder in the forest, for love of your mate, permit us to enter your dwelling."

The celebrated fourteenth-century bard Dafydd ap Gwilym refers to Gwyn in a number of texts, suggesting that the character was widely known in Wales during the medieval period. In Y Dylluan, he describes the eponymous owl as the "fowl of Gwyn ap Nudd". Y Pwll Mawn, in which the bard tells an unfortunate autobiographical account in which he and his horse were almost drowned in a lake, described as the "fish lake of Gwyn ap Nudd" and "the palace of the elves and their children."

Gwyn is often associated with the Wild Hunt, in a role akin to Woden or Herne the Hunter. Some traditions name Gwyn's chief huntsman as Iolo ap Huw, who, every Halloween, "may be found cheering Cŵn Annwn over Cader Idris". In the Black Book of Carmarthen Gwyn states that his finest hound is Dormarch.

According to a 14th-century Latin manuscript against witchcraft, Welsh "dynion hysbys" (soothsayers) would repeat the following:

Ad regem Eumenidium,
et reginam eius:
Gwynn ap Nwdd
qui es ultra in silvis
pro amore concubine
tue permitte nos venire domum.

Translation:

To the King of the Faeries,
and to his Queen:
Gwyn ap Nudd
thou who art far in the forest
for the love of your consort
permit us to enter thy dwelling.

The Latin term Eumenidium is used, which can be translated as "the Benevolent Ones" and act as a euphemism to mean y tylwyth teg or faeries, and the king of the faeries is Gwyn ap Nudd; with logic, it could be argued that Gwyn ap Nudd is "Eumenidium."

== Etymology ==
Gwyn means "fair, bright, white", cognate with the Irish fionn, both deriving from a reconstructed Common Celtic stem *windos 'the white one'. As such, he has some connection to the Irish hero Fionn mac Cumhail, whose maternal great-grandfather was Nuada. The name of Gwyn's father, Nudd, appears like Nuada to be cognate with the Brythonic deity Nodens.

Gwyn is in everyday use as a common noun and adjective: it also remains a popular personal name. Especially in Old and Middle Welsh, "gwyn" also has the connotations of "pure, sacred, holy".
