= Gwythyr ap Greidawl =

Welsh mythological figure

In Welsh mythology, Gwythyr ap Greidawl was a rival of Gwyn ap Nudd, a deity connected with the otherworld. In the Middle Welsh prose tale Culhwch ac Olwen, he is named as a member of Arthur's retinue and takes part in the quest to win the hand of Olwen for Arthur's cousin, Culhwch. Gwthyr would join Arthur on a journey to Pennant Gofid in Hell to retrieve the blood of the witch Orddu. His father is Greidawl Galldonyd, a fellow knight in Arthur's court. In Bonedd yr Arwyr, his genealogy is given as Gwythyr son of Greidawl the son of Enfael the son of Deigyr the son of Dyfnwal the son of Ednyfed the son of Maxen the son of Llywelyn. The Welsh Triads name him as the father of Arthur's second wife, also named Gwenhwyfar.

Sometime before the main events of Culhwch and Olwen, Gwythyr was engaged to marry Creiddylad, daughter of Lludd, who was stolen from him by her brother, Gwyn ap Nudd. In a violent battle, Gwyn defeated his rival, kept Creiddylad and took a number of Gwythyr's chieftains prisoner. When Arthur heard of this, he forced Gwyn to release the noblemen and made peace between the two adversaries.

Every Calan Mai, the two would fight over Creiddylad, until a battle on Judgment Day, in which the victor would keep her forever. Their rivalry has been taken to represent the contest between summer and winter and is a variant of the Holly King myth.
