= Remittance man =

Emigrant from Britain paid to stay away

In British history, a remittance man was an emigrant, often from Britain to a British colony, who was supported by regular payments from home on the expectation that he would stay away.

In this sense, remittance means the opposite of today's meaning of money that migrants send to their home countries.

== Definitions ==
"Remittance man" is defined in The Canadian Encyclopedia as "a term once widely used, especially in the West before WWI, for an immigrant living in Canada on funds remitted by his family in England, usually to ensure that he would not return home and become a source of embarrassment."

The Oxford English Dictionary adds: "spec[ifically] one considered undesirable at home; also in extended use." "Remittance man" is first attested in 1874 as a colonial term. One of the citations is of T. S. Eliot's 1958 play The Elder Statesman in which the son of the title figure resists his father's attempts to find him a job: "Some sort of place where everyone would sneer at the fellow from London. The limey remittance man for whom a job was made." The OED gives "remittancer" as another form, which stretches back to 1750.

== Analysis and examples ==
In Victorian British culture, a remittance man was usually the black sheep of an upper- or middle-class family who was sent away (from the United Kingdom to the rest of the British Empire), and paid to stay away. He was generally of dissolute or drunken character and may have been sent overseas after disgraces at home. Harry Grey, 8th Earl of Stamford, is an example; he was sent to South Africa before he inherited the titles and fortune of his third cousin.

The historian Monica Rico describes in Nature's Noblemen: Transatlantic Masculinities and the Nineteenth-Century American West (2013) how the figure emerged in the 1880s: "Unable to succeed in Britain [...] the remittance man represented the utter failure of elite British masculinity to function in the modern world." Where he was to go was a wide-open question. The British Empire offered wide-open spaces and possibilities of redemption in Canada, Australia, New Zealand, and colonial parts of Africa. Some thought that the American West was also an appropriate destination. Rico concludes that "the remittance man, in his weakness, symbolized his culture's fear that British masculinity was imperiled both in Britain and abroad."

Western Canada had its share of remittance men. The journalist Leroy Victor Kelly (1880–1956) wrote The range men: Pioneer ranchers of Alberta (1913) to capture their stories. "To the ordinary Western [Canadian] mind, a remittance man was a rich Englishman who had proven a failure in his homeland and had been shipped into the raw land to kill himself in quiet or work out his regeneration if possible." He was "everlasting sources of enjoyment and personal gain" for the tough ranchers and early colonists, "the natural butt of the cowboys' jokes." Remittance men were held in scorn by all, even "solid contempt," and were considered easy targets by conmen and tellers of tall tales. Some, however, won redemption by, for example, joining the Royal Canadian Mounted Police in the Yukon.

Not all of those men were considered dissolute disgraces. Some were simply younger sons of the English landed gentry or aristocracy, because until 1925, the law of primogeniture meant that the eldest son inherited the estate, which left the others to find their own fortunes. In his profile of the Wet Mountain Valley surrounding Westcliffe, Colorado, the author Morris Cafky wrote in 1966 that after the initial wave of settlers,

Other venturesome folk followed—Englishmen this time. They too took up homesteads. Many of these newcomers were remittance men from prominent British families, a state of affairs which caused some to dub the region "The Valley of the Second Sons". For years, activities on many a valley ranch or farm ground to a halt at precisely 4 p.m. so that all could partake of high tea.

(Presumably, that is afternoon tea, as for the Englishmen high tea meant the evening meal.)

He went on to differentiate between this type and others who followed, "individuals who were more used to the saloon [bar] than the salon."

A University of Michigan professor of journalism drew on his Alberta childhood to write "Mr Langhorne: A Prairie Sketch," which begins: "The thing about a Remittance Man, of course, is that nobody ever knows for sure whether or not he is a Remittance Man." He characterises them as locked into secrecy, including giving up their real name. The stipend, regular but not lavish, dooms them to eke out an existence: "The remittance naturally saps his energy and wilts his ambition, if any." It is not enough to set up a business, and so their fates are sealed. As the New York Times headline put it in 1914, with reference to mining camps, "Where 'Remittance Men' Abound; Most Americans of That Ilk Work, but English Don't."

Low Life: Lures and Snares of Old New York (1991) documents the life and politics of lower Manhattan from the mid-19th century to the early 20th century. Lucy Sante describes the hoboes and flophouses of the first fifteen years of the 20th century: "Among the tramps and bums were enigmatic sorts and instant legends. There were said to be Oxford graduates and men with dueling scars from German universities. There were remittance men from old families whose month would follow a rigorously determined cycle: Funds would arrive, followed by new clothes and feasting and carousing; then the money would be gone, the clothes would be pawned, and there would follow a week or two of utter destitution, each stage accompanied by a corresponding shift of lodging." The binge-and-starve cycle was remarked on in Antipodean Notes (1888) by the British traveller Elim Henry D'Avignor.

The term can be used to refer to an eccentric person, the town character.

== Remittance women ==
There were also "remittance women", but they are rarely discussed in scholarly works. A few examples include Bertha E. Kyte Reynolds, who lived in a tent outside Banff in the Rocky Mountains in the early 1900s, until an Anglican clergyman persuaded her relatives to increase her allowance, and Jessie de Prado MacMillan, a Scottish woman who homesteaded in New Mexico from about 1903.

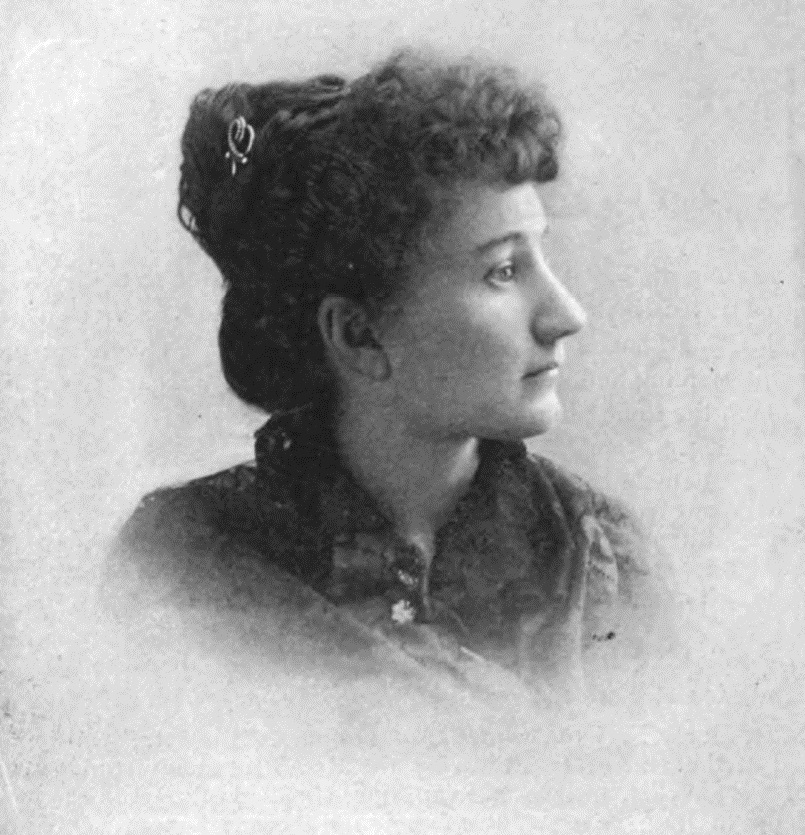
Ella Higginson

Ella Higginson, poet laureate of Washington State, applied some poetic licence to the story of royal scandal publicised by Edward Mylius. The case that went to trial concerned an alleged secret marriage in 1890 between the young naval officer, who was to become George V, and a daughter of Admiral Sir Michael Culme-Seymour, 3rd Baronet. As Higgison tells it, in Alaska: The Great Country (1909), when the young royal had to renounce this marriage, his beloved was given the most royal of exiles; near the City of Vancouver "in the western solitude, lived for several years—the veriest remittance woman—the girl who should now, by the right of love and honor, be the Princess of Wales, and whose infant daughter should have been the heir to the throne."

The New Yorker in 1979 referred to Lady Blanche Hozier, the mother of Clementine Churchill, by this term: in "Dieppe, a traditional escape route for English who have been exiled for one reason or another, [...] she gracefully lived the life of a remittance woman, gambled obsessively at the casino, and established a little salon".

== Popular representations in media ==
The remittance man was a recognisable type in literature of the period, especially in Britain, Canada, and Australia.

Rudyard Kipling writes repeatedly about remittance men and their brothers-in-arms, the gentleman rankers, men whose birth and station would otherwise usually lead to their commission as officers, but who instead enlisted as common soldiers. A remittance man appears as a tragic figure in his New Zealand story "One Lady at Wairakei" (1891).

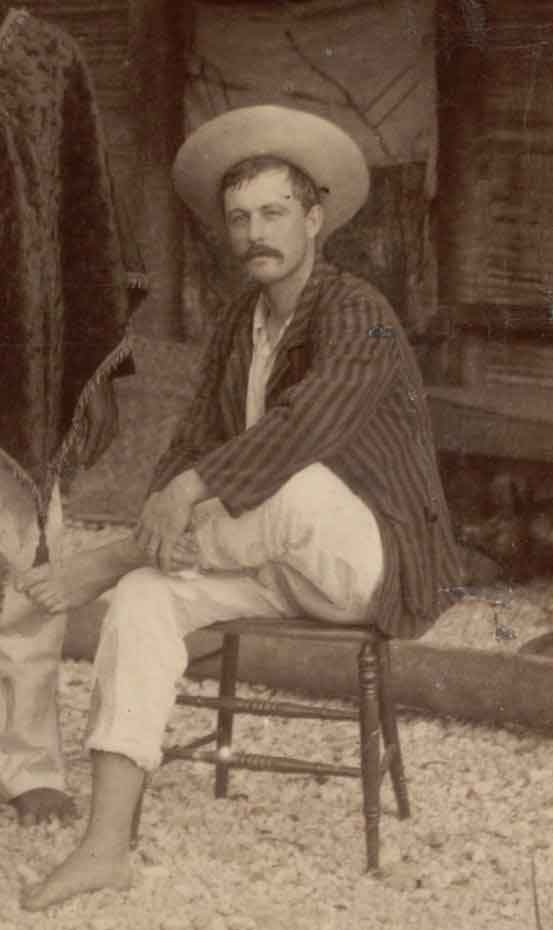
Jack Buckland

The 1892 novel The Wrecker, written by Robert Louis Stevenson and his stepson Lloyd Osbourne, is a "South Sea yarn" featuring a "remittance man". In the book,

Tom Hadden (known to the bulk of Sydney folk as Tommy) was heir to a considerable property, which a prophetic father had placed in the hands of rigorous trustees. The income supported Mr. Hadden in splendour for about three months out of twelve; the rest of the year he passed in retreat among the islands.

Tommy is based on Jack Buckland (born 1864, Sydney; died 1897, Suwarrow Island), the handsome, happy-go-lucky, fellow cabin passenger on the 1890 Janet Nicholl voyage.

In Following the Equator (1897), Mark Twain's travelogue presented as non-fiction, he describes the first remittance men he met. One was a hopeless alcoholic, "the most interesting and felicitous talker". Another on the same ship was only 19 or 20 but already "a good deal of a ruin".

Passengers explained the term to me. They said that dissipated ne'er-do-wells belonging to important families in England and Canada were not cast off by their people while there was any hope of reforming them, but when that last hope perished at last, the ne'er-do-well was sent abroad to get him out of the way. He was shipped off with just enough money in his pocket—no, in the purser's pocket—for the needs of the voyage—and when he reached his destined port he would find a remittance awaiting him there. Not a large one, but just enough to keep him a month. A similar remittance would come monthly thereafter. It was the remittance-man's custom to pay his month's board and lodging straightway—a duty which his landlord did not allow him to forget—then spree away the rest of his money in a single night, then brood and mope and grieve in idleness till the next remittance came. It is a pathetic life.

Also in 1897, Hilda Stafford and The Remittance Man, a pair of novellas set in California, were published by Beatrice Harraden. The remittance man in question can reach mature adulthood only when the money from home is stopped.

The Canadian poet Robert Service included "The Rhyme of the Remittance Man", which shares its meter and most of its rhyme scheme with Kipling's similarly themed 1892 "Gentlemen-Rankers", in his 1907 anthology Songs of a Sourdough. It was published in the US as The Spell of the Yukon and Other Verses):

Far away, so faint and far, is flaming London, fevered Paris,
That I fancy I have gained another star;
Far away the din and hurry, far away the sin and worry,
Far away—God knows they cannot be too far.
Gilded galley-slaves of Mammon—how my purse-proud brothers taunt me!
I might have been as well-to-do as they
Had I clutched like them my chances, learned their wisdom, crushed my fancies,
Starved my soul and gone to business every day.

William Henry Pope Jarvis (1876–1944), who was described in The Oxford Companion to Canadian Literature as a journalist born in Prince Edward Island, wrote the epistolary novel The Letters of a Remittance Man to his Mother (1908, John Murray).

The Remittance Woman was a 1923 silent film, featuring Ethel Clayton and directed by Wesley Ruggles. The following year a book of the same title appeared, by American pulp author Achmed Abdullah.

In Brideshead Revisited, Sebastian Flyte is thus referred to by the British Consul to Charles Ryder on the latter's visit to Morocco:

This is no place for a remittance man. The French [i.e. the colonial authorities] don't understand him at all. They think everyone who's not engaged in trade is a spy. It's not as though he lived like a Milord.

The Australian poet Judith Wright (1915–2000) included "Remittance Man" in her first collection, The Moving Image (1946). It begins:

The spendthrift, disinherited and graceless,
accepted his pittance with an easy air,
only surprised he could escape so simply
from the pheasant-shooting and the aunts in the close

One of Stephen Marlowe's recurring characters (c. 1960) is Andrea Hartshorn, who describes her situation thus: "Robbie is a remittance man. I'm a remittance woman. We're paid a monthly stipend to keep out of the family's hair. Remittance men. The polite word is expatriate."

Prince Yakimov, an Englishman of noble Russian descent, is a character in Olivia Manning's The Great Fortune. Yakimov is always "waiting for his remittance" as he sponges off the expatriate community in wartime Bucharest.

Tom Wolfe, in The Bonfire of the Vanities, uses the term to refer to a wealthy Englishman's good-for-nothing daughters who spend their days on the New York City party circuit.

Jimmy Buffett wrote a song, "Remittance Man", for his album Barometer Soup. Buffett took inspiration from Mark Twain's description of meeting two remittance men during the voyage chronicled in his travelogue Following the Equator.

== See also ==
- Emigration
- Exile
- Ostracism
- Superfluous man
