= Tontine =

Investment plan

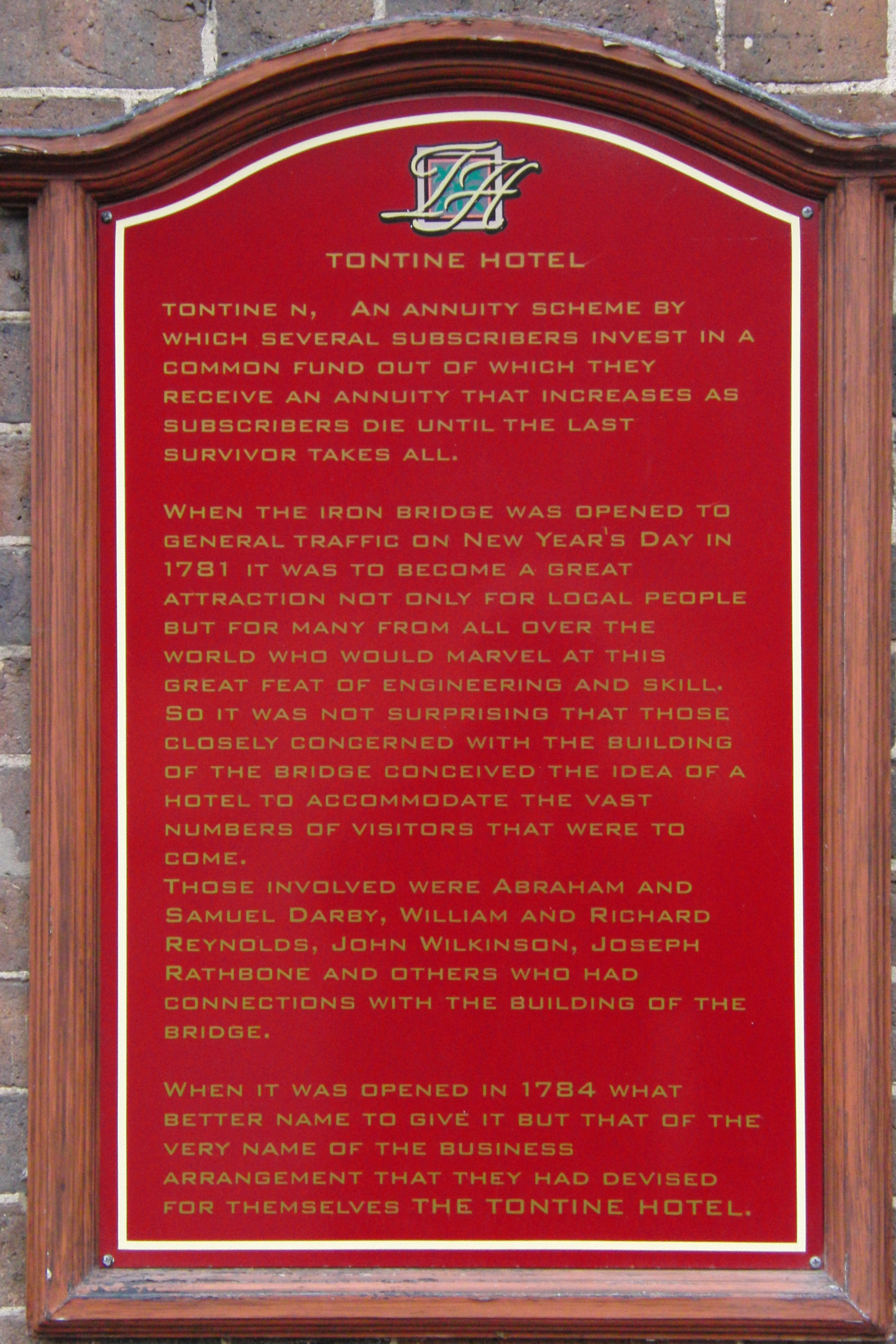
Tontine Hotel sign, Ironbridge, Shropshire, UK

A tontine (/ˈtɒntaɪn, -iːn, ˌtɒnˈtiːn/) is an investment linked to a living person which provides an income for as long as that person is alive. Such schemes originated as plans for governments to raise capital in the 17th century and became relatively widespread in the 18th and 19th centuries.

Tontines enable subscribers to share the risk of living a long life by combining features of a group annuity with a kind of mortality lottery. Each subscriber pays a sum into a trust and thereafter receives a periodical payout. As members die, their payout entitlements devolve to the other participants, and so the value of each continuing payout increases. On the death of the final member, the trust scheme is usually wound up.

Tontines are still common in France. They can be issued by European insurers under the Directive 2002/83/EC of the European Parliament. The Pan-European Pension Regulation passed by the European Commission in 2019 also contains provisions that specifically permit next-generation pension products that abide by the "tontine principle" to be offered in the 27 EU member states.

Questionable practices by U.S. life insurers in 1906 led to the Armstrong Investigation in the United States restricting some forms of tontines there. Nevertheless, in March 2017, The New York Times reported that tontines were getting fresh consideration in the United States as a way for people to get steady retirement income.

== History ==
The investment plan is named after Neapolitan banker Lorenzo de Tonti, who is popularly credited with inventing it in France in 1653. He more probably merely modified existing Italian investment schemes, while another precursor was a proposal put to the Senate of Lisbon by Nicolas Bourey in 1641. Tonti put his proposal to the French royal government, but after consideration it was rejected by the Parlement de Paris.

The first true tontine was therefore organised in the city of Kampen in the Netherlands in October 1670, and was soon followed by three other cities. The French finally established a state tontine in 1689 (though it was not described by that name because Tonti had died in disgrace, about five years earlier). The English government organised a tontine in 1693. Nine further government tontines were organised in France down to 1759; four more in Britain down to 1789; and others in the Netherlands and some of the German states. Those in Britain were not fully subscribed, and in general the British schemes tended to be less popular and successful than their continental counterparts.

By the end of the 18th century, the tontine had fallen out of favour as a revenue-raising instrument with governments, but smaller-scale and less formal tontines continued to be arranged between individuals or to raise funds for specific projects throughout the 19th century, and, in modified form, to the present day.

== Concept ==
Each investor pays a sum into the tontine. Each investor then receives annual interest on the capital invested. As each investor dies, their share is reallocated among the surviving investors. This process continues until the death of the final investor, when the trust scheme is wound up. Each subscriber receives only interest; the capital is never paid back.

Strictly speaking, the transaction involves four different roles:

1. the government or corporate body that organizes the scheme, receives the contributions and manages the capital
2. the subscribers who provide the capital
3. the shareholders who receive the annual interest
4. the nominees on whose lives the contracts are contingent

In most 18th- and 19th-century schemes, parties 2 to 4 were the same individuals; but in a significant minority of schemes each initial subscriber–shareholder was permitted to invest in the name of another party (generally one of his or her own children), who would inherit that share on the subscriber's death.

Because younger nominees clearly had a longer life expectancy, the 17th- and 18th-century tontines were normally divided into several "classes" by age (typically in bands of 5, 7 or 10 years): each class effectively formed a separate tontine, with the shares of deceased members devolving to fellow-nominees within the same class.

Works of fiction (see In popular culture below) often feature a variant model of the tontine in which the capital devolves upon the last surviving nominee, thereby dissolving the trust and potentially making the survivor very wealthy. It is unclear whether this model ever existed in the real world.

== Patent ==
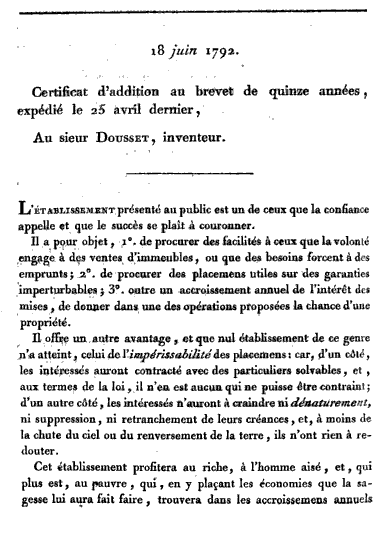
First page of Dousset 1792 French patent for a tontine

Financial inventions were patentable under French law from January 1791 until September 1792. In June 1792 a patent was issued to inventor F. P. Dousset for a new type of tontine in combination with a lottery.

== Uses and abuses ==
Louis XIV first made use of tontines in 1689 to fund military operations when he could not otherwise raise the money. The initial subscribers each put in 300 livres and, unlike many later schemes, this one was run honestly; the last survivor, a widow named Charlotte Barbier, who died in 1726 at the age of 96, received 73,000 livres in her last payment. The English government first issued tontines in 1693 to fund a war against France, part of the Nine Years' War.

Tontines soon caused financial problems for their issuing governments, as the organisers tended to underestimate the longevity of the population. At first, tontine holders included men and women of all ages. However, by the mid-18th century, investors were beginning to understand how to game the system, and it became increasingly common to buy tontine shares for young children, especially for girls around the age of 5 (since girls lived longer than boys, and by which age they were less at risk of infant mortality). This created the possibility of significant returns for the shareholders, but significant losses for the organizers. As a result, tontine schemes were eventually abandoned, and by the mid-1850s tontines had been replaced by other investment vehicles, such as "penny policies", a predecessor of the 20th-century pension scheme.

A property development tontine, The Victoria Park Company, was at the heart of the notable case of Foss v Harbottle in mid-19th-century England.

== Projects funded by tontines ==
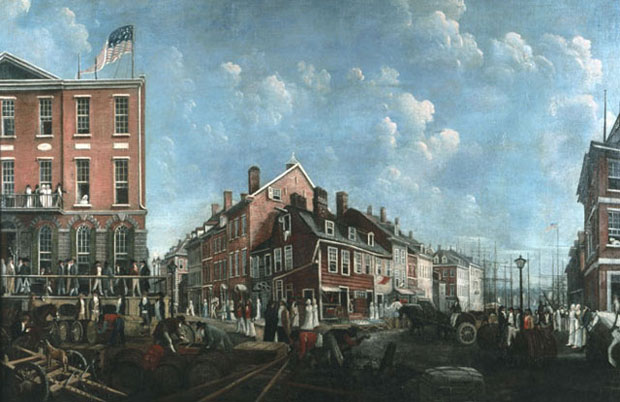
The Tontine Coffee House (at left) on Wall Street, New York City

Tontines were often used to raise funds for private or public works projects. These sometimes contained the word "tontine" in their name.

Some notable tontine-funded projects included:

- The Assembly Rooms, Bath, were built between 1769 and 1771, funded by a tontine.
- Richmond Bridge, across the River Thames west of London, was financed through a tontine authorised by the Richmond Bridge Act 1773 (13 Geo. 3. c. 83). Once the bridge was completed in 1777, it was the toll charged to cross the bridge that was shared between the investors, each receiving a larger share as the others died. The last survivor received the entire toll income until his death when the toll booth on the south bank was demolished, and the bridge became free to cross. Although the bridge was widened on the upstream side in 1938 using the original facing stones, the bridge remains the oldest bridge crossing the Thames.
- The Tontine Hotel in Ironbridge, Shropshire, stands prominently at one end of the Iron Bridge from which the town takes its name: it was built in 1780–84 by the proprietors of the bridge to accommodate tourists who came to view this wonder of the industrial age.
- The Tontine Hotel and Assembly Rooms, Glasgow, were funded through two tontines of 1781 and 1796.
- The Tontine Coffee House on Wall Street in New York City, built in 1792, was the first home of the New York Stock Exchange.
- The first Freemasons' Hall, London. Subscribers were able to nominate someone other than themselves as the person on whose life the share was staked. On the subscriber's death they could leave their share to that person, or to anyone else. The scheme raised £5,000, but cost £21,750 in interest over its 87-year life.
- The Tontine Hotel, Greenock, Inverclyde, Scotland, was built in 1803.
- The Cleveland Tontine hotel, near Ingleby Arncliffe, North Yorkshire, originally a coaching inn on the Yarm to Thirsk turnpike road, was financed using a tontine in 1804.
- The Theatre Royal, Bath, was erected in 1805, funded through a tontine, with the Prince Regent and his brother Prince Frederick among the subscribers.

== Tontine pensions in the US: 1868–1906 ==
Tontines became associated with life insurance in the United States in 1868 when Henry Baldwin Hyde of the Equitable Life Assurance Society introduced them as a means of selling more life insurance and meeting the demands of competition. Over the next four decades, the Equitable and its imitators sold approximately 9 million policies – two-thirds of the nation's outstanding insurance contracts. During the Panic of 1873 many life insurance companies went out of business as deteriorating financial conditions created solvency problems: those that survived had all offered tontines. However, the contracts included an obligation to maintain monthly payments, and as a result spawned large numbers of policy owners whose life savings were wiped out by a single missed payment. The profits produced by the tontines' deferred payout structures proved tempting for the issuers – especially the profligate James Hyde. As the funds in the investment account accumulated, they found their way into directors' and agents' pockets, and also into the hands of judges and legislators, who reciprocated with prejudicial judgments and laws.

Finally, in 1905, the Armstrong Investigation was set up to enquire into the selling of tontines. It resulted in the banning of the continued sale of any tontines which contained toxic clauses for consumers. In essence, these toxic versions of tontine pensions were effectively (though not literally) outlawed in response to corrupt insurance company management.

When Equitable Life Assurance was establishing its business in Australia in the 1880s, an actuary of the Australian Mutual Provident Society criticised tontine insurance, calling it "an immoral contract" which "put a premium on murder". In New Zealand at the time, another of the chief critics of tontines had been the government, which also issued its own insurance.

== Modern regulation ==
In France and Belgium, tontines clauses are inserted into contracts such as ownership deeds for property as a means to potentially reduce inheritance tax.

The First Life Directive of the European Union includes tontines as a permitted class of business for insurers. However, this does not mean that tontines should be considered insurance contracts universally. According to the Supreme Court of the United States the nature of "insurance" involves some investment risk-taking on the part of the company. Tontines replace idiosyncratic longevity risk with systemic longevity risk and therefore have aspects of insurance; however, unless the issuer of a tontine provides a fixed return, the issuer assumes no true risk in the insurance sense.

The new Pan-European Pension legislation which came into effect in March 2022 specifically paves the way for other types of financial service providers to create new pension products that abide by the "tontine principle" which tontine PEPP (pan-European Personal Pension Product) products can be offered throughout Europe once approved in a single member state.

In most places in the United States using tontines to raise capital or obtain lifetime income is consistently upheld as being legal; however, legislation in two states has fostered the false perception that selling tontines in the broader U.S. is not legal.

Several new pension architectures have been designed or deployed which partially or fully utilise the tontine risk-sharing structure including:

- Collective defined contribution (CDC) pensions which can be offered in the UK,
- Pan-European Pensions which can be offered in 27 EU member countries plus Switzerland, Canada, Norway Iceland & Liechtenstein,
- Pooled Annuity Funds
- Group Self-Annuitization Schemes.

In August 2025, the United States issued Executive Order 14330, which directed federal agencies to review guidance on alternative assets in defined-contribution retirement plans and explicitly referenced “lifetime income investment strategies including longevity risk-sharing pools,” a category that some legal commentators have noted bears conceptual similarity to historical tontines, notwithstanding differences in structure and regulation.

== Variant uses of the term ==
In French-speaking cultures, particularly in developing countries, the meaning of the term "tontine" has broadened to encompass a wider range of semi-formal group savings and microcredit schemes. The crucial difference between these and tontines in the traditional sense is that benefits do not depend on the deaths of other members.

As a type of rotating savings and credit association (ROSCA), tontines are well established as a savings instrument in central Africa, and in this case function as savings clubs in which each member makes regular payments and is lent the kitty in turn. They are wound up after each cycle of loans. In West Africa, "tontines" – often consisting of mainly women – are an example of economic, social and cultural solidarity.

Informal group savings and loan associations are also traditional in many east Asian societies, and under the name of tontines are found in Cambodia, and among emigrant Cambodian communities.

In Singapore, the Chit Funds Act of 1971 defines the application of legislation to the operation of chit funds, which were also known colloquially as tontines (although more properly a variant type of ROSCA).

In Malaysia, chit funds are primarily known as "kootu funds", which again are ROSCAs and which are defined under the Kootu Funds (Prohibition) Act 1971 as "...a scheme or arrangement variously known as a kootu, cheetu, chit fund, hwei, tontine or otherwise whereby the participants subscribe periodically or otherwise to a common fund and such common fund is put up for sale or payment to the participants by auction, tender, bid, ballot or otherwise...".

In the UK during the mid-20th century, the term "tontine" was applied to communal Christmas saving schemes, with participants making regular payments of an agreed sum through the year, which would be withdrawn shortly before Christmas to fund gifts and festivities.

== In popular culture ==
Tontines (or schemes described as tontines) have been featured as plot devices in many stories, movies and television programs, including:

- La Tontine (1708), a comic play by Alain-René Lesage. A physician, hoping to raise the funds to give his daughter a dowry, buys a tontine on the life of an elderly peasant, whom he then strives to keep alive.
- The Great Tontine (1881), a novel by Hawley Smart
- The Wrong Box (1889), a comic novel by Robert Louis Stevenson and Lloyd Osbourne. The plot revolves around a tontine originally taken out for some wealthy English children, and the resulting shenanigans as younger family members of the two final elderly survivors vie to secure the final payout. The book was adapted as a film, The Wrong Box, produced and directed by Bryan Forbes, in 1966.
- The Secret Tontine (1912), an atmospheric faux-gothic novel by Robert Murray Gilchrist, set in the Derbyshire Peak District during a snowy winter in the late 19th century. The plot involves the potential beneficiaries of a covert tontine, and their scheme to murder their ignorant rivals.
- Lillian de la Torre's short story "The Tontine Curse" (1948) features mysterious deaths related to a tontine in 1779, being investigated by Samuel Johnson.
- The Tontine (1955), a novel by Thomas B. Costain, illustrated by Herbert Ryman, is set in nineteenth-century England and tells a story centered around the fictional "Waterloo Tontine", established to benefit veterans of the Napoleonic wars. Among other plot twists, shareholders hire an actor to impersonate a dead nominee, and conspire to murder another member.
- In 4:50 from Paddington (1957), a Miss Marple murder mystery by Agatha Christie, the plot revolves around the will of a wealthy industrialist, which establishes a settlement under which his estate is divided in trust among his grandchildren, the final survivor to inherit the whole. The settlement is described, inaccurately, as a tontine. K. Tombs uses the term in the same (inaccurate) way in a more recent murder mystery, The Malvern Murders.
- Something Fishy (1957), a novel by P. G. Wodehouse, features a so-called tontine under which the investors' sons stand to gain from marrying late.
- In the U.S. television series The Wild Wild West, Episode 16 of Season Two (1966–67) – "The Night of the Tottering Tontine" – finds James West and Artemus Gordon protecting a man who is a member of a tontine whose members are being murdered one by another.
- "Old Soldiers", an eighth-season episode of the television series M*A*S*H, focuses on a tontine set up among Colonel Potter and several of his Army buddies from World War I. While taking shelter in a château during an artillery barrage, they had found a cache of brandy and drank all but one bottle, which they set aside for the last survivor. After the only other surviving member dies, Potter receives the bottle in the mail and shares it with his staff, drinking first to his departed friends and then to the new ones he has made at the 4077th.
- In the Barney Miller episode "The Tontine" (1982), one of the last two surviving family members who invested in the tontine attempts to kill himself so that the other can have the money before growing too old to enjoy it.
- In The Simpsons episode "Raging Abe Simpson and His Grumbling Grandson in 'The Curse of the Flying Hellfish'" (1996), Grampa Simpson and Mr. Burns are the final survivors of a tontine to determine ownership of art looted during World War II. Grampa eventually kicks Burns out of the tontine for trying to kill him, but before he and Bart can do anything with the art, agents of the US State Department arrive to return the paintings to a descendant of the original owner.
- The Mystery of Men (1999), a TV film starring Warren Clarke, Neil Pearson and Nick Berry, deals with four friends in a tontine scheme suddenly realising they will benefit from each other's deaths.
- In S. L. Viehl's science fiction multi-volume novel Stardoc (2000), the title character is accused of spreading a plague to several colony worlds, on one of which the colonists had established a tontine. The sole survivor, a little girl, consequently becomes so wealthy that in the second book of the series – Beyond Varallan (2000) – she buys the bank behind the colonies to free the Stardoc from the debt she now owes.
- The 2001 comedy film Tomcats features a variation on a tontine where the last investor to get married gets the full amount of the invested funds.
- The Diagnosis: Murder episode "Being of Sound Mind" (2001) features a tontine as a motive for murder.
- In the US television Archer episode "The Double Deuce" (2011), Archer's valet Woodhouse is revealed as one of three final survivors of a group of World War I Royal Flying Corps squadron mates who each put £50 into an interest-bearing account, now worth nearly a million dollars. The office workers at ISIS HQ, realizing that a new tontine could capitalize on the high mortality rate of field agents, begin persuading people to join.
- The Brokenwood Mysteries episode "Tontine" (2018) centers on a tontine.

== See also ==
- Life estate
- Dead pool

== Sources ==
- Buley, R. Carlyle (1967). The Equitable Life Assurance Society of the United States 1859–1964. New York: Appleton-Century-Crofts.
- Clark, Geoffrey (1999). Betting on Lives: the culture of life insurance in England, 1695–1775. Manchester: Manchester University Press. ISBN 9780719056758.
- Coudy, Julien (1957). "La Tontine royal sous le règne de Louis XIV". Revue historique de droit français et étranger (in French). 4th ser. 35: 128–33.
- Dunkley, John (2007). "Bourbons on the Rocks: tontines and early public lotteries in France". Journal for Eighteenth-Century Studies. 30 (3): 309–23. doi:10.1111/j.1754-0208.2007.tb00338.x.
- Gallais Hamonno, Georges; Berthon, Jean (2008). Les emprunts tontiniers de l'Ancien Régime: un exemple d'ingénierie financière au XVIIIe siècle (in French). Paris.
- Green, David R. (2019). "Tontines, annuities and civic improvements in Georgian Britain". Urban History. 46 (4): 649–94. doi:10.1017/s0963926818000743. S2CID 150555505.
- Jennings, Robert M.; Trout, Andrew P. (1976). "The Tontine: fact and fiction". Journal of European Economic History. 5: 663–70.
- Jennings, Robert M.; Trout, Andrew P. (1982). The Tontine: from the reign of Louis XIV to the French Revolutionary era. Homewood, IL.
- Jennings, Robert M.; Swanson, Donald F.; Trout, Andrew P. (1988). "Alexander Hamilton's tontine proposal". William and Mary Quarterly. 3rd ser. 45 (1): 107–115. doi:10.2307/1922216. JSTOR 1922216.
- McDiarmid, Andrew (2024). "The development of mutual aid tontines in nineteenth-century Ireland". Irish Economic and Social History. 51 (1): 32–47. doi:10.1177/03324893241243022.
- McKeever, Kent (2011). "A Short History of Tontines". Fordham Journal of Corporate & Financial Law. 15 (2): 491–521.
- Milevsky, Moshe A. (2015). King William's Tontine: why the retirement annuity of the future should resemble its past. Cambridge: Cambridge University Press. ISBN 978-110-707612-9.
- Weir, David R. (1989). "Tontines, Public Finance, and Revolution in France and England, 1688–1789". Journal of Economic History. 49: 95–124. doi:10.1017/s002205070000735x. S2CID 154494955.
- Wyler, Julius (1916). Die Tontinen in Frankreich (in German). Munich and Leipzig.
