= Suwarrow =

Atoll in the south Pacific Ocean

Coordinates: 13°16′9″S 163°6′41″W

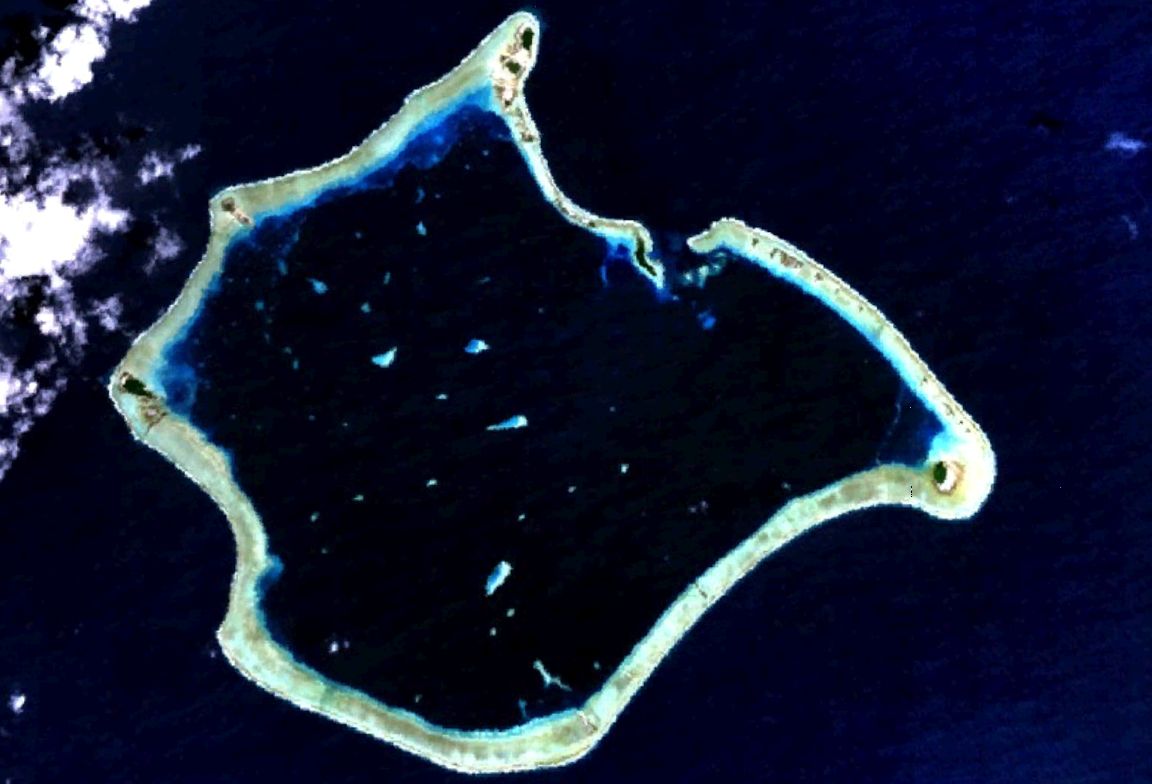
- Satellite image of Suwarrow. Anchorage Island is immediately west of the lagoon's entrance
- Interactive map of Suwarrow

Geography
- Location: Central-Southern Pacific Ocean
- Archipelago: Cook Islands
- Area: 9.8 km^{2} (3.8 sq mi)

Administration
- Cook Islands

Demographics
- Population: 2 (seasonal)
- Ethnic groups: Polynesian

Location of Suwarrow Atoll in the Pacific Ocean

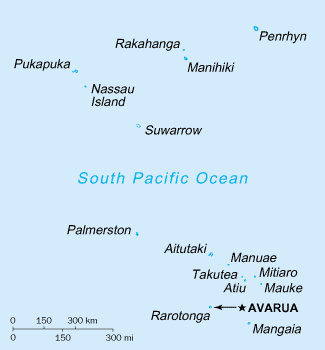
Map of Cook Islands with Suwarrow near the middle

Suwarrow (also called Suvorov, Suvarou, or Suvarov) is an island in the northern group of the Cook Islands in the south Pacific Ocean. It is about 1,300 kilometres (810 mi) south of the equator and 930 kilometres (580 mi) north-northwest of the capital island of Rarotonga.

== Geography ==
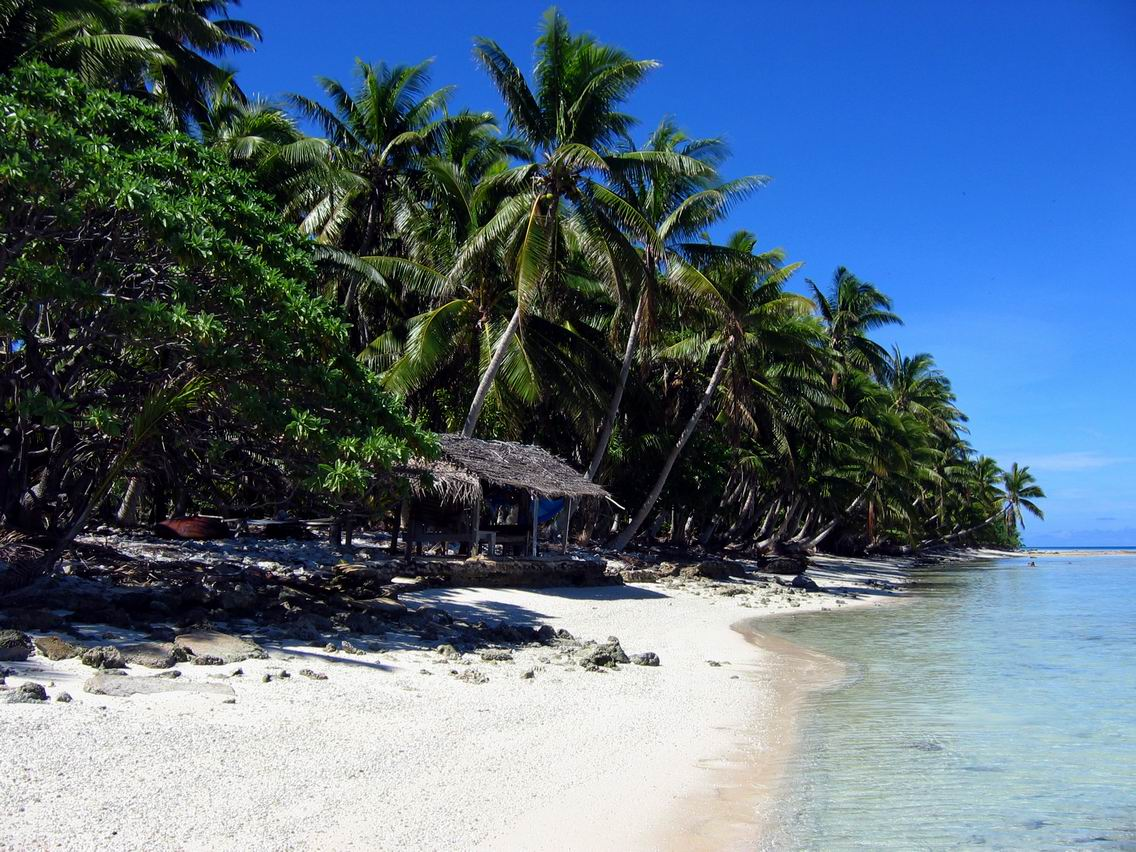
Anchorage Island

Suwarrow is a roughly quadrilateral-shaped coral atoll, 80 kilometres (50 mi) in circumference, with over 20 small islets (motu) surrounding a central lagoon 19 by 8 kilometres (11.8 by 5.0 mi). Cyclones often create storm surges which sweep over the atoll since its small component of land is extremely low-lying.

=== Table of Islets ===
| Island | Area km^{2} | Population |
|---|---|---|
| Anchorage Island | 0.139 | 1 |
| East Island | 0.278 | 0 |
| Entrance Island | 0.014 | 0 |
| Manu Island | 0.121 | 0 |
| Motu tou Island | 0.31 | 0 |
| One Tree Island | 0.134 | 0 |
| Other (Brushwood Island, Whale Island, Gull Island) | 0.39 | 0 |
| Turtle Island | 0.214 | 0 |
| Suwarrow total | 1.6 | 1 |

== History ==
Although Suwarrow was inhabited by Polynesians during prehistory it was uninhabited when discovered by the Russian-American Company ship Suvorov, which reportedly followed clouds of birds to the atoll on 17 September 1814. (The ship was named after Russian general Alexander Suvorov, who appears as "Suwarrow" in Lord Byron's epic poem Don Juan and also in Alaric Alexander Watts' alliterative poem "The Siege of Belgrade".) It has been only intermittently inhabited since. The atoll's name has also been spelled variously as Souvorow, Souwaroff, and Souworoff. "Suwarrow" is the official spelling adopted by New Zealand.

In the mid-19th century (records dispute whether it was in 1848 or 1855), a ship from Tahiti was carrying out salvage work when a box containing NZ$15,000 worth of coins was dug up. Some years later, New Zealander Henry Mair found pieces of eight in a turtle nest. Mair became involved in a dispute, the find was covered up, and it has never been rediscovered.

John Lavington Evans was the first lessee of Suwarrow, who passed his lease to the Pacific Islands Trading Company Limited. Evans remained as the superintendent of the company's operations in the Pacific. In 1867, Captain Handley B. Sterndale was engaged by the company and sailed with Evans from Melbourne, Australia to the Cook Islands (then known as the Harvey Group). While one ship was lost off the reef of Rarotonga, on 16 October 1867, Sterndale, Evans and 18 men, 2 women and 3 children (who had been engaged in Rarotonga), arrived at Suwarrow where they intended to stay and gather pearl shell, beche-de-mer and copra. Sterndale and the islanders were landed along with approximately 4 months supply of food and a water condensing apparatus to produce fresh water. Evans departed on the ship, with the expectation of returning within 4 months with food supplies. By the middle of March 1868, the provisions were exhausted and Evans had not returned. On 17 April Captain Bully Hayes (the notorious blackbirder) arrived on the brig Rona, with 109 islanders from Niue (then known as Savage Island) who were being transported to Tahiti. Hayes agreed to rescue Sterndale and the islanders, notwithstanding the Rona was already crowded, with Sterndale and the Islanders being delivered to Rakahanga (Reirson island), from where they eventually were able to travel to Tahiti. Sterndale sold the pearl shell, beche-de-mer, copra and equipment to Hayes. Sterndale later discovered that Evans had travelled to Samoa and sold the ship and departed to Sydney, and concealed that Sterndale and the islanders were on Suwarrow with a limited supply of provisions and no boats capable of leaving the island.

In 1876 the atoll was leased to Henderson and Macfarlane of Auckland, which built a wharf, installed a light on a wooden pyramid, and commenced to gather mother of pearl. The firm's agent, Handley B. Sterndale, in 1877 enacted a dubious transfer to his colleague William J. Hunt, who in turn offered in 1886 to sell the island to Russia. British sovereignty was proclaimed 22 April 1889. In 1903 the atoll was leased to Lever Brothers, "for the purpose of removing guano or other fertilising substances therefrom, and of planting the land with coconuts, and for collecting pearl-shells, and for other purposes of a like nature." They maintained about thirty persons on the island until a cyclone in 1914 so severely damaged operations that the island was abandoned.

In April 1890 Robert Louis Stevenson, his wife Fanny Vandegrift Stevenson, and her son Lloyd Osbourne were passengers on the trading steamer Janet Nicoll, which called at Suwarrow during a trading cruise around the central Pacific. Fanny, describing the atoll in her journal, called Suwarrow "the most romantic island in the world." The journal of Fanny Vandegrift Stevenson was published under the title The Cruise of the Janet Nichol. Jack Buckland was also a passenger on Janet Nicoll; he later returned to Suwarrow to be the island trader.

During World War II, Robert Dean Frisbie and several Coastwatchers lived on the largest islet, Anchorage. Frisbie wrote about his experiences in The Island of Desire. In 1942, a cyclone washed away 16 of the 22 islets in the atoll. The coastwatchers left a hut with water tanks behind, and left wild pigs and chickens on the islet. Later, cats were allowed to run wild on Anchorage Island, to control Polynesian rats which were documented to occur there since the island was discovered by Europeans (Jones 2001) but conceivably were introduced by Polynesian seafarers a longer time ago.

New Zealander Tom Neale lived alone on Suwarrow for a total of 16 years in three periods between 1952 and 1977. He described his experience in the first two of those periods in An Island to Oneself (1966 ISBN 0-918024-76-5). In 1964, while Neale was in Rarotonga, June von Donop, a former accountant from Honolulu, Hawaii, lived alone in his house on Suwarrow for a week, while her crewmates on the schooner Europe stayed on board their vessel. Michael Swift lived alone on Suwarrow in 1965–66, but he was not familiar with survival techniques and had a hard time finding sufficient food.

In 1978, the island was declared a National Park of the Cook Islands due to the plentiful marine and bird wild life it supports. The island and surrounding water is Crown land. A proposal to establish an aquaculture operation to farm Tahitian pearls was successfully opposed by Cook Islands environmental NGO, the Taporoporo'anga Ipukarea Society.

In October 2011, Russian politician Anton Bakov claimed to have purchased the atoll and declared it the capital of a new Russian Empire. The claim was denied by Prime Minister Henry Puna.

== Flora and fauna ==
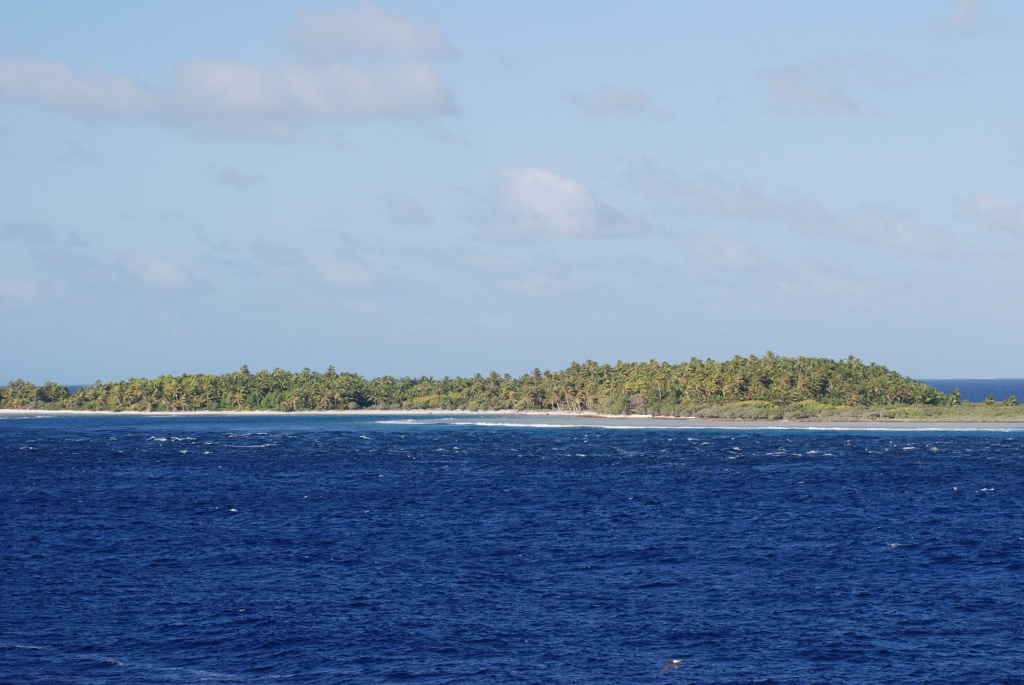
Vegetation on the island seen from the sea

Most of the small islets have only herbs and shrubs, with Pemphis acidula and beach heliotrope (Tournefortia argentea) growing in abundance. The larger islands have a dense interior vegetation of Cordia subcordata (tou); indeed, the westernmost island, Motu Tou is named after this woodland (Jones 2001).

At the end of the 20th century, 3% of all red-tailed tropicbirds in the world (some 400) bred there, as well as 9% of the global population of the lesser frigatebird (about 8500, though only a part of these seem to be present at any one time) (Jones 2001). The atoll has been designated an Important Bird Area (IBA) by BirdLife International because it supports, as well as the tropicbirds and frigatebirds, a large breeding colony of sooty terns, with over 40,000 chicks counted in 2008. It is also a non-breeding site for bristle-thighed curlews.

Suwarrow has a rich marine biodiversity, which supports megafauna such as sea turtles, sharks, mantas, and cetaceans including humpback, sperm, and false killer whales.

== Demographics ==
Every five years, the Cook Islands government advertises for the Suwarrow island nature reserve caretaker position. The position is staffed between April and October by two persons. The caretakers monitor the atoll's birdlife. As of 2023, the rangers are no longer customs officials, and check in must occur on one of the main Cook Islands. Previous caretakers have brought their families with them, so the population was significantly higher, but that is not the case today. The barge that brings them also brings six months of supplies such as canned food, and several more rangers that clean the island on the first day and leave the caretakers behind.

The only way to visit the island is with a private yacht or by chartered expedition from Rarotonga, and visitors require permits from the park authorities before being permitted to land.
