= The Wrong Box =

1966 British film by Bryan Forbes

- United States VHS Cover
- Directed by: Bryan Forbes
- Written by: Larry Gelbart; Burt Shevelove
- Based on: The Wrong Box by Robert Louis Stevenson and Lloyd Osbourne
- Produced by: Bryan Forbes; Jack Rix; Larry Gelbart; Burt Shevelove
- Starring: John Mills; Ralph Richardson; Michael Caine; Peter Cook; Dudley Moore; Nanette Newman; Tony Hancock; Peter Sellers
- Cinematography: Gerry Turpin
- Edited by: Alan Osbiston
- Music by: John Barry
- Production company: Salamander Film Productions
- Distributed by: Columbia Pictures
- Release dates: 26 May 1966 (London, England)
- Running time: 107 minutes
- Country: United Kingdom
- Language: English

The Wrong Box is a 1966 British comedy film produced and directed by Bryan Forbes and starring John Mills, Ralph Richardson and a large ensemble cast. The screenplay was by Larry Gelbart and Burt Shevelove, based on the 1889 novel The Wrong Box by Robert Louis Stevenson and Lloyd Osbourne. It was made by Salamander Film Productions and distributed by Columbia Pictures.

== Plot ==
In the early 19th century, a lawyer tells a group of boys that a tontine has been organised; £1,000 has been invested for each child (£20,000 in total), but only the last survivor will receive all the capital and interest. Sixty-three years later, the last survivors are elderly brothers Masterman and Joseph Finsbury, who live next to each other in Victorian London.

Although Masterman has not talked to his despised brother in years, he sends his medical student grandson Michael Finsbury to summon Joseph to see him. Michael is greeted by Joseph's niece Julia, who says Joseph is in Bournemouth with her cousins. Julia's cousins, Morris and John, receive a telegram from Michael saying that Masterman is dying.

On the train to London, Joseph escapes his grandson minders, entering a compartment and boring the occupant with a diatribe of trivia. Joseph goes to smoke a cigarette, leaving his coat, which the occupant, "the Bournemouth Strangler", dons. The train collides with another train. Finding a mangled body in their uncle's coat, Morris and John assume their uncle is dead. To protect their interest in the tontine, they hide the body in the woods. Morris tells John to post the body in a crate to London. Joseph wanders away from the accident scene.

In London, Michael gets a telegram telling him to expect a statue in a crate. Morris arrives and mistakes the elderly butler, Peacock, for Masterman.

Morris decides to hide the body until Masterman dies, then claim Joseph died of a heart attack upon hearing the news. Morris and John plot to ship the body in a barrel to Joseph's home where Julia lives. Joseph makes his own way to London and visits his brother. Masterman makes several attempts to kill his oblivious brother. They quarrel, and as Joseph leaves the barrel is being delivered to Masterman's house by mistake. Joseph signs for the barrel for "Mr Finsbury". Minutes later, the crate containing the statue is mistakenly delivered to Joseph's house and accepted by Julia.

Morris sees a delivery wagon leaving and assumes his uncle's body has been delivered. He goes to obtain a blank death certificate from Dr. Pratt. Michael helps move the crate into Joseph's house. Julia and Michael kiss for the first time. Michael says they cannot do this as they are cousins; then they discover they were both adopted, thus unrelated by blood.

Michael discovers the body in the barrel and assumes his grandfather killed his brother. When Julia arrives, Michael hides the body in a piano. That night, Michael hires "undertakers" to dump the corpse in the River Thames. When they arrive, Masterman has just fallen down stairs, so they take his unconscious body. Seeing this, Morris assumes Masterman has died.

Morris and John go to claim the tontine with the fake death certificate. The lawyer tells them it is now worth £111,000.

Masterman is returned home by the Salvation Army, who assume he has drowned. Julia orders a fancy coffin for him. Morris orders a cheap coffin to remove the mutilated body, but it is delivered to the wrong house, and Michael sells the piano, unaware the body is still in it. The police become involved when that body is discovered. Masterman sits up as the coffin is being taken away.

The cousins make off with the tontine money in a hearse. Michael and Julia chase Morris and John aboard another hearse. They then encounter a real funeral procession. After a crash, Morris and John realise they have a body instead of the money. The tontine money is about to be buried when they grab it and run off. The box bursts open, and money is blown around the cemetery. Joseph pops up from the open grave just as Masterman arrives. The lawyer arrives to say the tontine has yet to be won. The police detective arrives, and Morris is arrested. They ask who put the body in the piano, as there is a £1000 reward for catching the Bournemouth Strangler. A new argument ensues.

== Cast ==
- John Mills as Masterman Finsbury
- Ralph Richardson as Joseph Finsbury
- Michael Caine as Michael Finsbury
- Peter Cook as Morris Finsbury
- Dudley Moore as John Finsbury
- Nanette Newman as Julia Finsbury
- Peter Sellers as Dr. Pratt
- Tony Hancock as detective
- Wilfrid Lawson as Peacock
- Thorley Walters as Lawyer Patience
- Cicely Courtneidge as Major Martha
- Diane Clare as Mercy
- Gerald Sim as First undertaker
- Irene Handl as Mrs. Hackett
- John Le Mesurier as Dr. Slattery
- Peter Graves as military officer
- Nicholas Parsons as Alan Frazer Scrope
- James Villiers as Sydney Whitcombe Sykes
- Graham Stark as Ian Scott Fife (killed in tontine)
- Jeremy Lloyd as Brian Allen Harvey
- Leonard Rossiter as Vyvyan Alistair Montague (killed in tontine)
- Valentine Dyall as Oliver Pike Harmsworth
- John Junkin as 1st engine driver
- Timothy Bateson as official
- Norman Bird as spiritual
- Norman Rossington as first hooligan
- Tutte Lemkow as The Bournemouth Strangler
- Juliet Mills as woman on train (uncredited)
- Reg Lye as third undertaker
- The Temperance Seven as themselves

== Production ==
Pinewood Studios, Iver, Buckinghamshire, was the main production base for the studio sets and many exteriors, with the Victorian London crescent exteriors being shot on Bath's historic Royal Crescent, complete with TV aerials on the roofs. The funeral coach and horse chase was filmed in St James's Square, Bath, and on Englefield Green, Surrey, and surrounding lanes.

== Reception ==
The Monthly Film Bulletin wrote: "Anyone with fond recollections of the Stevenson-Osbourne novel would be well advised to be wary of this version of The Wrong Box. Not that it hasn't some very funny moments – thanks mainly to Ralph Richardson's manically boring Uncle Joseph, Peter Sellers as the cat-festooned venal doctor, and Wilfrid Lawson as a wonderfully ancient butler – but they are just moments, buried in a quagmire of damp inventions which destroy a story already quite inventive enough. ...The Wrong Box is a swinging comedy in the contemporary manner. Which means that it is a slapdash affair in which anything goes, irrespective of whether or not it fits ... The thing that is signally lacking in this adaptation is the completely coherent, quietly zany logic which was the original's greatest charm."

Bosley Crowther wrote in The New York Times, "Perhaps the best of the clowning is the little bit Mr. Sellers does as this drink-sodden, absent-minded skip-jack, fumbling foolishly and a little sadly among his cats. But Mr. Richardson is splendid as a scholarly charlatan, and Mr. Mills and Mr. Lawson are capital as a couple of fuddy-duddy crooks. Sure, the whole nutty business is tumbled together haphazardly in the script that has been written – or maybe scrambled – by Larry Gelbert and Burt Shevelove. Some sections and bits are funnier than others. Some are labored and dull. It is that sort of story, that sort of comedy. But it adds up to a lively lark."

Dennis Schwartz called it a "Mildly amusing silly black comedy."

AllMovie wrote, "By turns wacky and weird, The Wrong Box is a welcome alternative to standard issue film comedies."

In his autobiography What's it All About?, Michael Caine wrote of the movie's reception, that the film "is so British that it met with a gentle success in most places except Britain, where it was a terrible flop. I suppose this was because the film shows us exactly as the world sees us - as eccentric, charming and polite – but the British knew better that they were none of these things, and it embarrassed us."

== Awards and nominations ==
Year	Awards	Category	Nominee	Result
1967	British Academy Film Awards	Best British Costume	Julie Harris	Won
1967	British Academy Film Awards	Best British Actor	Ralph Richardson	Nominated
1967	British Academy Film Awards	Best British Art Direction	Ray Simm	Nominated
