= Fred Whibley =

Fredrick George Whibley
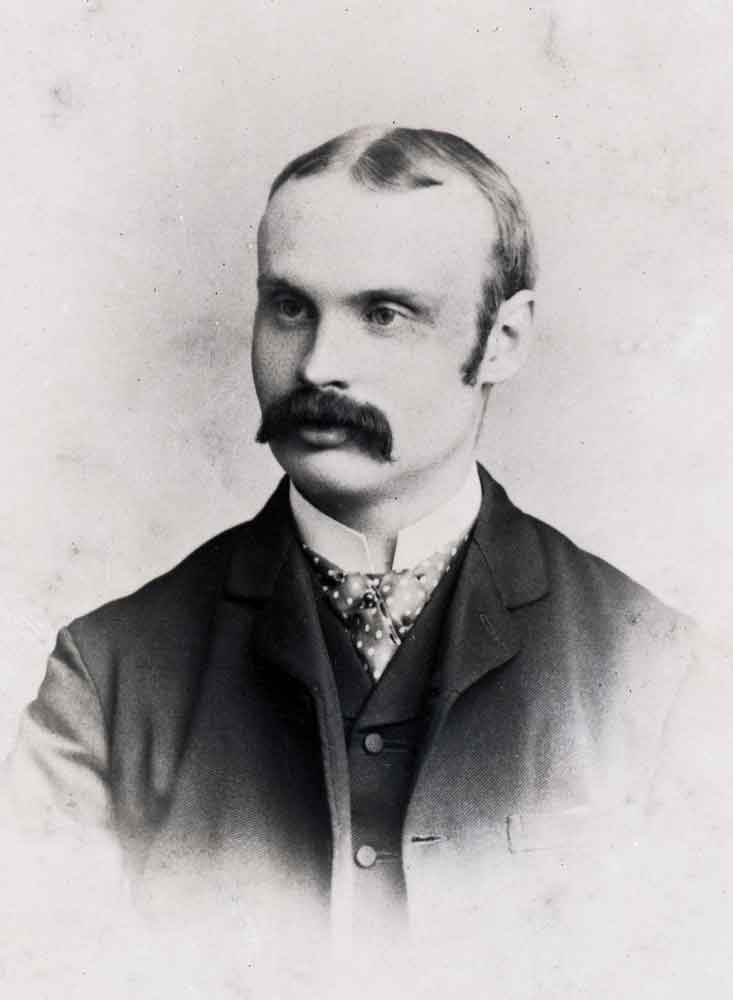
- Fred Whibley, Island trader on Niutao 1898 to 1909 (Fred Whibley c.1888)
- Born: 1855; Sittingbourne, Kent, England
- Died: 1919 (aged 63–64); Funafuti, Tuvalu, (Then known as the Ellice Islands)
- Other name: Fred Whibley
- Occupation: island trader
- Parent(s): Ambrose Whibley and Anne Parkes

Fredrick George Whibley (1855–1919) abandoned a career as clerk in a London bank to escape from the constraints and social expectations of respectability in the Victorian era. He ended up as a copra trader on Niutao in the Ellice Islands in the central Pacific Ocean.

Whibley was born in 1855 in Sittingbourne, Kent, England, the youngest son of Ambrose Whibley, silk mercer, and his first wife, Anne Parkes. He was educated at Bristol Grammar School.

After the death of Anne in 1855 Ambrose Whibley married Mary Jean Davy, the daughter of John Davy, an iron merchant of Bristol. Fred Whibley was the half-brother of Charles Whibley, journalist and writer and Leonard Whibley, classical scholar and Fellow of Pembroke College, Cambridge from 1899-1910. Fred’s sister, Eliza Eleanor (Lillie) Whibley, married John T. Arundel, owner of John T Arundel and Company which operated in the Pacific.

== Early life ==
From 1873 to 1888 Fred Whibley worked as a clerk in a bank. In 1888, aged 33, Whibley left England for North America. In 1891 he was in Vancouver. In 1898 he wrote to Charles Whibley asking whether his brother had repaid $15 to Gordon T Legg, who was the manager of the Union Steamship Company of British Columbia. Fred Whibley had borrowed the money to travel from Vancouver B.C., to Sydney, Australia, where his sister Eliza was living with her husband John T. Arundel.

Fred Whibley had the reputation as the black sheep of what was otherwise a respectable Victorian era family. Not always the gentleman, while in Vancouver Fred appears to have fallen out with a Mrs. Machin as he writes to his brother Charles Whibley about "dirty letters from Vancouver, but let them go. Mrs. Machin is a b-tch from B-tchville, and invents the most impossible lies. She is only fit for Bedlam. I say so much and finish with her and Vancouver for good."

== Niutao, Ellice Islands (Tuvalu) ==
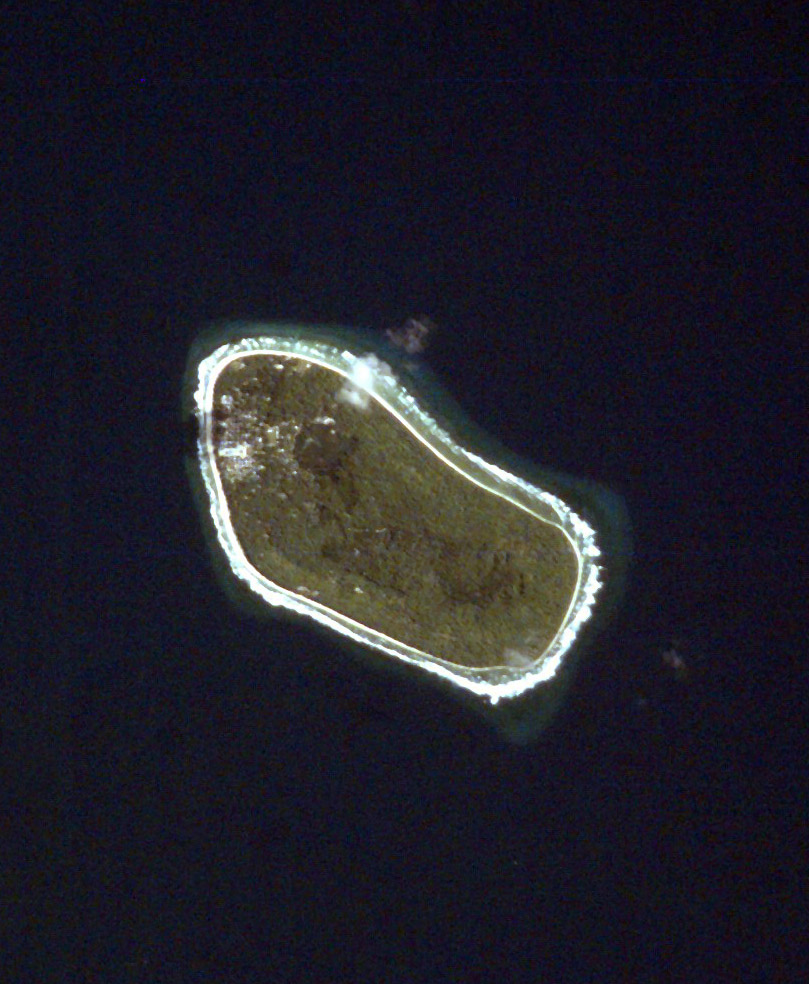
Niutao

While in Sydney, Australia, Whibley declined an offer from John T. Arundel to work for his company John T. Arundel & Co., which mined guano on Pacific atolls and which within two years would evolve into the Pacific Islands Co. and then subsequently the Pacific Phosphate Co., which exploited high-grade phosphate deposits on Nauru and Banaba (then known as Ocean Island) that were refined to create superphosphate. Whibley appears to be one of those Europeans who chose to live on an isolated Pacific atoll as an escape from the constraints and social expectations of respectability in the Victorian era.

In May or June 1898 Whibley arrived in Niutao in Tuvalu (then known as the Ellice Islands) to work as the resident island trader buying copra for the Henderson and Macfarlane, which then dominated the copra trade in Tuvalu. Henderson & Macfarlane operated their vessel SS Archer to call on islands in Fiji, Tuvalu, and Kiribati (formerly the Gilbert Islands).

Whibley was called "Felele" by the Niutaons. His wife, Meri Matavaka was of the Luaseuta family of Niutao. Meri being a Tuvaluan variation of ‘Mary’. Meri’s previous "avaga" (married one) had been Jack Buckland the former palagi trader on Niutao; she had refused to go with Jack Buckland to when he moved to the neighbouring island of Nanumea. During her time with Jack Buckland Meri had visited Vailima in Samoa as Jack had become a friend of Robert Louis Stevenson during the 1890 voyage of the ‘Janet Nicoll’ on which Stevenson and Fanny Vandegrift Stevenson were passengers.

Fred Whibley wrote to his brother Charles Whibley "Read R L Stevenson's & L.O's "Wrecker" - there in Tommy Hadden, towards the end will you find the missus's previous 'usband. He was a scorcher!. Stayed at R L S' s at Vailima 6 mos on end, with Matavaka - my missus. - She has given me quite a picture in her own tongue, - of their life there - in the Master's house, and of the amenities. - Some day, - if you might be interested I would detail it to you. - It would be off the line of what you may have heard or read at home, but all favourable to the decent, peace-loving, sensitive quiet, good man, who to me is little short of a fetish."

Fred Whibley and Meli had three daughters Lucy (born 1899), Felicita (known as Fay, born 1905) and Lillian (born 1911 as a twin, the brother died at birth, with Meri also dying following the birth). Captain Ernest Frederick Hughes Allen, of the Samoa Shipping Trading Co Ltd, received a retainer from members of Whibley’s English family to bring him to Funafuti from Nuitao and to take care of him as he had "slipped into dereliction as a beachcomber".

Whibley died in 1919. The 3 children were raised by their large extended family of uncles, aunts and cousins overseen by their grandfather Luaseuta. The English relatives arranged for the 3 children to be sent to Auckland, New Zealand to go to school.

== The end of the era of European traders ==
During the time Whibley was an island trader, structural changes occurred in the operation of the Pacific trading companies with the trading companies moving from a practice of having traders resident on each island to trade with the islanders to a business operation whether the supercargo (the cargo manager of a trading ship) would deal directly with the islanders when a ship would visit an island. From 1900 the numbers of palagi traders in Tuvalu declined so that by 1909 there were no resident palagi traders representing the trading companies.
