= The Wrong Box (novel) =

1889 novel by Robert Louis Stevenson and Lloyd Osbourne

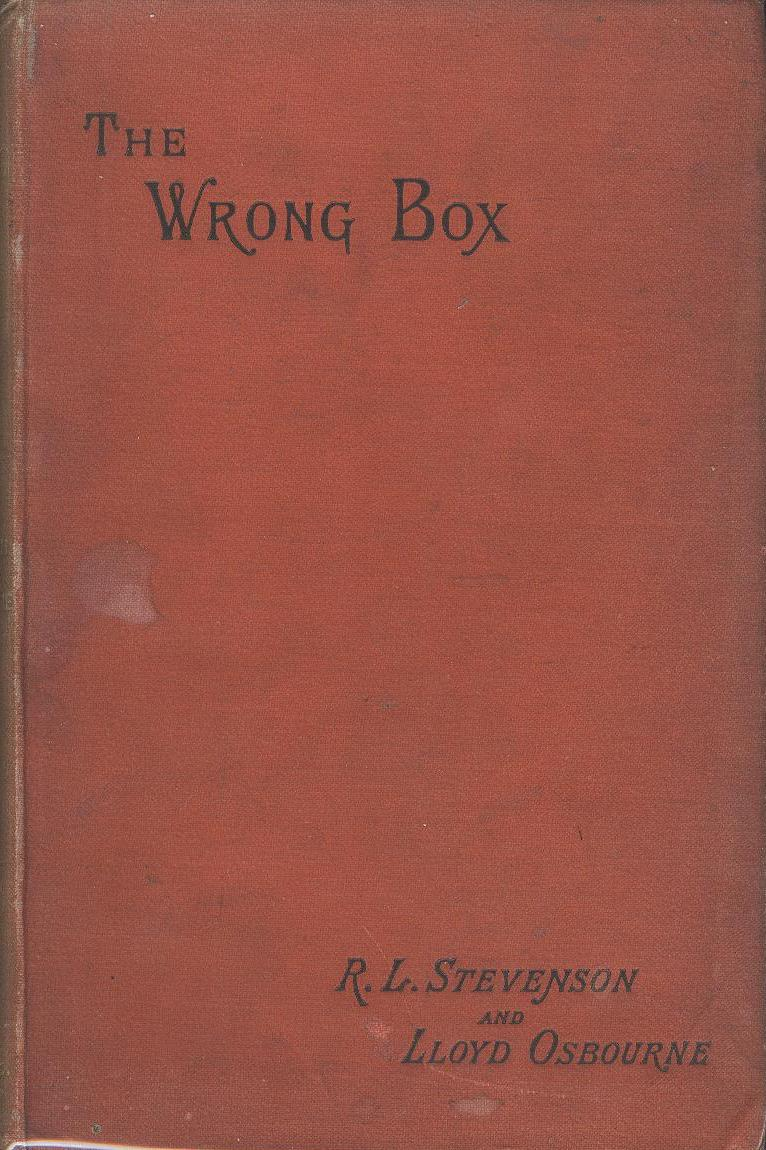
- First edition cover
- Author: Robert Louis Stevenson; Lloyd Osbourne
- Language: English
- Genre: Black comedy
- Publisher: Longmans, Green & Co.
- Publication date: 1889
- Publication place: Scotland
- Media type: Print (Hardback)
- Pages: 283
- Text: The Wrong Box at Wikisource

The Wrong Box is a black comedy novel co-written by Robert Louis Stevenson and Lloyd Osbourne, first published in 1889. The story is about two brothers who are the last surviving members of a tontine.

The book was the first of three novels that Stevenson co-wrote with Osbourne, who was his stepson. The others were The Wrecker (1892) and The Ebb-Tide (1894). Osbourne wrote the first draft of the novel late in 1887 (then called The Finsbury Tontine), Stevenson revised it in 1888 (then called A Game of Bluff) and again in 1889 when it was finally called The Wrong Box. A film adaptation, also titled The Wrong Box, was released in 1966, and a musical in 2002.

== Plot ==
Masterman Finsbury and his brother Joseph are the last survivors of a tontine in which they were enrolled as children along with 35 other young boys. Each child had a thousand pounds deposited in his name. The last of them to survive will receive the entire capital along with the accrued interest.

Masterman is now 73 and feeling his age. He lives a secluded life in the house of his son, Michael, a prominent lawyer. Joseph, two years younger, is in good health and leads an active life. He is the guardian of two nephews, Morris and John, and of the daughter of a friend, Julia Hazeltine. Having lost the combined fortunes of his three wards in the leather trade, he makes his house over to them, but this still leaves a deficit of £7,800. Morris agrees to support Joseph and Julia in return for Joseph's interest in the tontine.

Joseph and his wards are on holiday in Bournemouth when Morris becomes convinced that Masterman has died. Suspecting Michael of concealing the death, he rushes back to London with Joseph and John (Julia having gone on ahead). But their train crashes, leaving many dead and injured. In the confusion, Morris and John discover what they think is Joseph's body, but it is in fact that of another passenger who happens to be dressed similarly to Joseph. Aware that Joseph's death would rob them of the tontine, they hide the body in a temporary grave. Morris proposes that they send the body to London in a crate, and that they find a cottage to rent where John can stay, pretending that Joseph is staying with him. Meanwhile, Morris will go straight back to London to hide the crate in his basement. John reluctantly agrees to the plan, despite the fact that they can only find a run-down cottage in a dismal location.

Meanwhile, Joseph walks away from the crash site unharmed. Wishing to escape his nephews' company, he sets out for London alone. Michael happens to be on the same train, travelling with his friend, Geoffrey Wickham, a magistrate. Catching a glimpse of Joseph, they avoid him by ducking into the luggage van, where they notice two large packages. One is a barrel in which Morris has packed what he thinks is Joseph's body; the other is an enormous crate addressed to a Mr Pitman. After Michael returns to a passenger compartment, Wickham mischievously swaps the labels on the two consignments.

The enormous crate duly arrives at Morris's house. Gideon Forsyth, a lawyer and friend of Julia, happens to be passing. He helps Julia to get the crate into the house. They discover that it contains a huge statue of Hercules. Morris arrives and is greatly distressed to discover that the barrel has not arrived. At Waterloo Station he learns that the barrel was delivered to Pitman. In a fit of anger, he destroys the statue of Hercules.

Pitman, who is an artist, consults Michael, who is his lawyer, about the unexpected arrival of the barrel and the non-arrival of the statue. They break open the barrel, and are horrified to find that it contains a corpse. Afraid that they will be implicated in a murder, Michael arranges for his piano to be delivered to Pitman's house. He removes the strings and hides the body inside. Using assumed names, the two men visit Forsyth and engage him to act in a breach of promise case, sending him on a wild goose chase to Hampton Court. While he is away, they have the piano delivered to his house.

Forsyth in turn is horrified to discover the body in the piano. In order to get rid of it, he rents a houseboat and arranges for the piano to be sent there so that he can tip the corpse into the river. He is surprised to find that another houseboat moored nearby is that of his uncle, and that Julia is a guest on board. When Julia then comes on board his own boat in order to do some sketching, he is forced to explain the situation to her. Julia and the uncle agree to help him dispose of the body.

In fact, the piano never arrives. The carrier has been intercepted by a thief, who gets the carrier drunk and steals the cart along with its cargo. Nothing further is seen or heard of the piano.

John returns to London, having had a miserable time at the cottage. Michael summons John and Morris to his office, where they find Joseph alive and well. They learn that Masterman is also still alive. Michael offers to pay Morris and John the £7,800 that Joseph owes them and to hand them back control of the leather business, the financial situation of which has greatly improved. In return, Michael will acquire Joseph's interest in the tontine. Morris and John agree, which means that Michael will now receive the tontine regardless of who dies first.

== Literary significance and reception ==
Rudyard Kipling, in a letter to his friend Edmonia Hill (dated 17 September 1889), praised the novel:

I have got R.L. Stevenson's In the Wrong Box and laughed over it dementedly when I read it. That man has only one lung but he makes you laugh with all your whole inside.

== Adaptation ==
The Wrong Box was filmed in 1966 starring Michael Caine. The novel was also adapted as a stage musical in 2002, and a studio cast recording of the show was released in August 2013.
