= Isobel Osbourne =

Robert Louis Stevenson's step-daughter and sister of Lloyd Osbourne

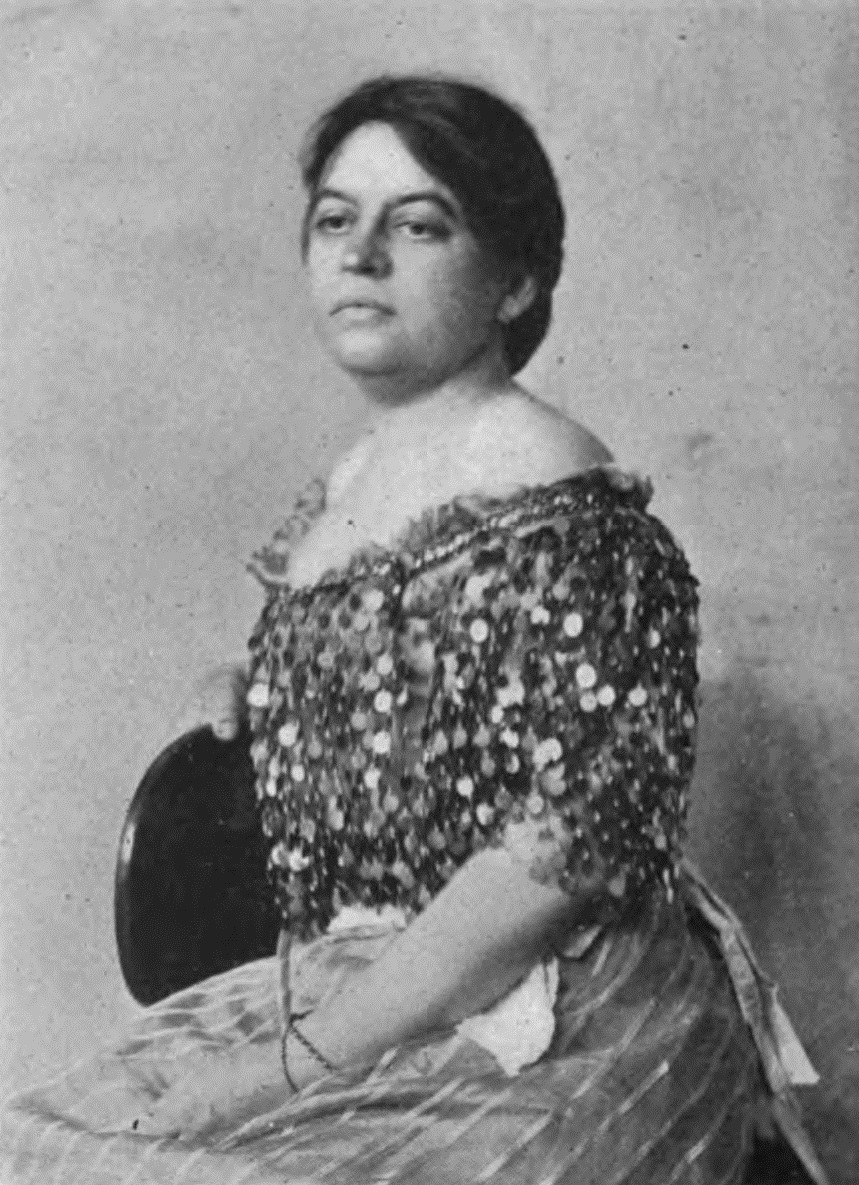
- Osborne c. 1898
- Born: Isobel Osbourne; September 18, 1858; Indianapolis, Indiana, U.S.
- Died: June 26, 1953 (aged 94); Santa Barbara, California, U.S.
- Other names: Isobel Strong, Isobel Field
- Known for: Stepdaughter of Robert Louis Stevenson
- Spouses: Joseph Dwight Strong (m. 1879; div. 1892) Edward Salisbury Field (m. 1914; died 1936)
- Children: 2
- Parent(s): Samuel Osbourne; Fanny Van de Grift
- Relatives: Lloyd Osbourne (brother); Robert Louis Stevenson (stepfather)

Isobel "Belle" Osbourne Strong Field (September 18, 1858 – June 26, 1953) was a writer and the daughter of Fanny Stevenson and sister of Lloyd Osbourne. Through her mother's second marriage, she was a stepdaughter of Robert Louis Stevenson.

== Biography ==
Osbourne was born in Indianapolis to Samuel and Fanny Van de Grift Osbourne. She married the artist Joseph Dwight Strong (1853–1899) in 1879, and had a son, Joseph Austin Strong (1881–1952) who later became a successful playwright. A second son was born to the Strongs, but he died before his first birthday. Belle and her family lived in Hawaii from 1883 to 1889. She designed the Royal Order of the Star of Oceania in 1886 for King Kalākaua and was one of the few women to be awarded the honor.

Belle and her family moved to Vailima, Samoa, in May 1891 with her mother and step-father. There she was Robert Louis Stevenson's literary assistant transcribing his words when he was too ill to write. Her husband Joseph Strong had a drinking problem and Belle divorced him in 1892.

In 1914, she married her mother's secretary (and possibly lover; Robert Louis Stevenson had died in 1894), the younger journalist Edward Salisbury Field, six months after her mother died. Field was only three years older than her son Austin. When oil was discovered on property owned by Field they became wealthy. In 1926 Field purchased Zaca Lake and surrounding land in the Figueroa Mountains near Los Olivos, California.

Isobel built an artists' studio there and the Field home became a popular meeting place for writers and actors. Isobel and her brother Lloyd wrote about Robert Louis Stevenson and their experiences in Samoa in Memories of Vailima (1902). Later Isobel wrote her memoirs in two books This Life I've Loved (1937) and A Bit of My Life (1951).

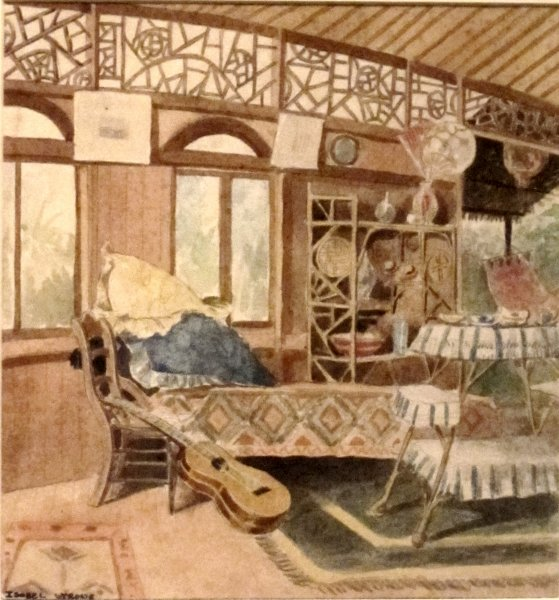
Allen Herbert’s House, 1896 watercolor painting by Isobel Osbourne, Honolulu Museum of Art

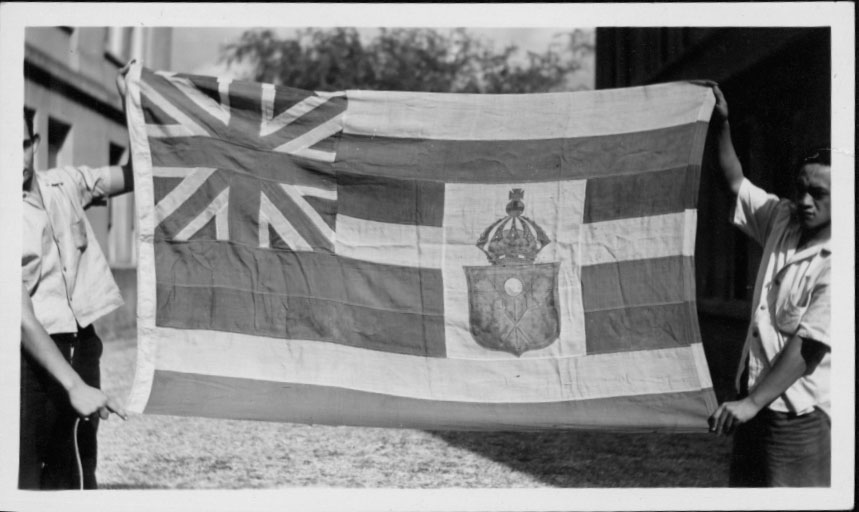
Isobel Osbourne designed a royal naval ensign similar to this for the Kaimiloa, the flagship of the Royal Hawaiian Navy.
