= Equator (schooner) =

Two-masted trading schooner

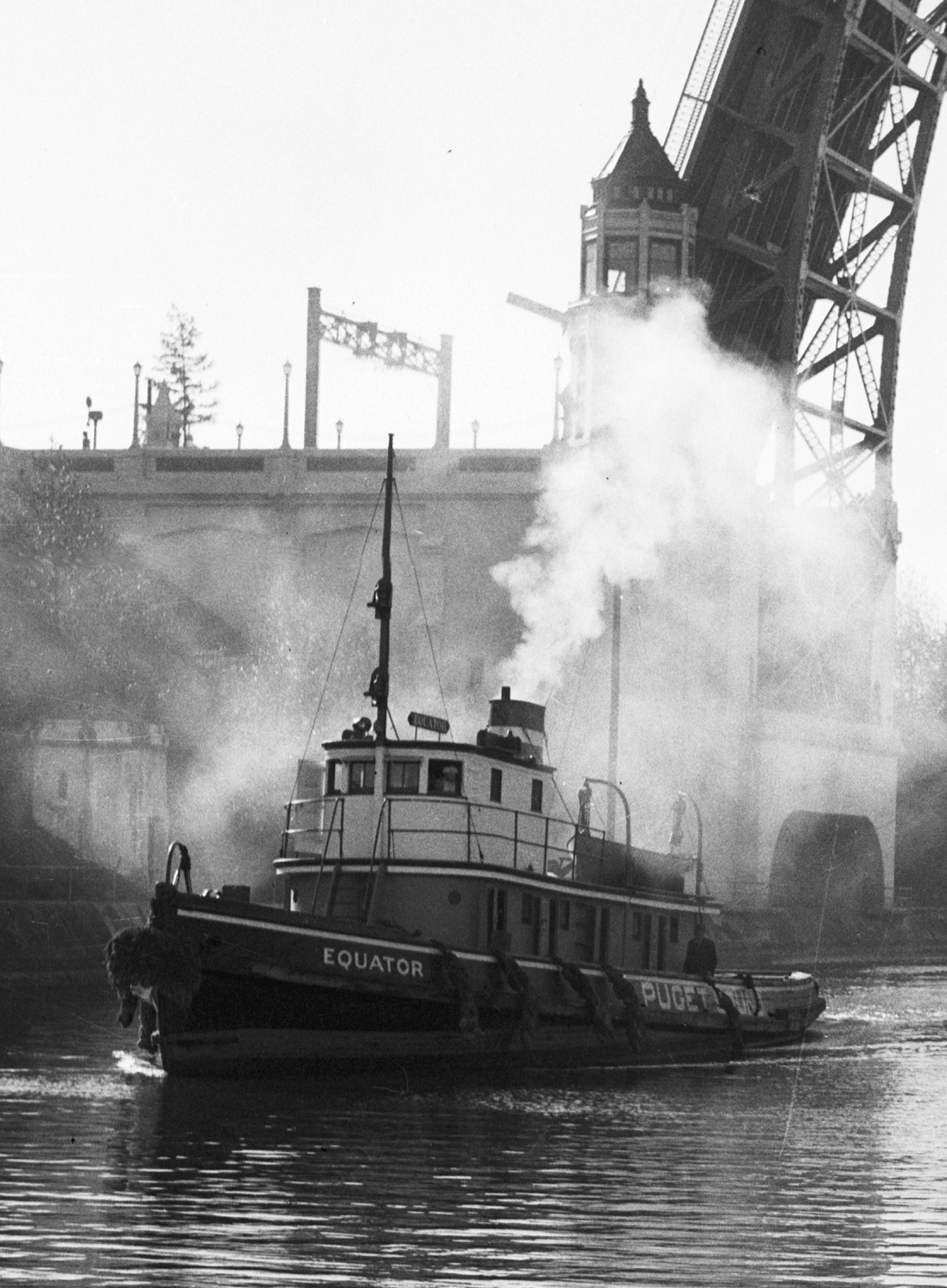
- Equator configured as a tugboat, 1934

History

United States
- Builder: Mathew Turner
- Launched: 1888
- Out of service: Abandoned in 1956
- Fate: Dismantled in 2023
- Status: Stored by Port of Everett, timber to be reused for public art piece

General characteristics
- Installed power: Steam (1890s–1920s); Gasoline (1920s–1941); Diesel (1941–1956)
- Sail plan: Schooner
- Equator
- U.S. National Register of Historic Places
- Location within Washington (state)
- Location: 14th St. Yacht Basin; Everett, Washington, United States
- Coordinates: 48°00′14″N 122°13′05″W
- Built: 1888
- Architect: Matthew Turner
- NRHP reference No.: 72001281
- Added to NRHP: 14 April 1972

Equator was a two-masted pygmy trading schooner known for carrying passengers Robert Louis Stevenson and Fanny Vandegrift Stevenson on a voyage through the islands of Micronesia in 1889. She was later used as a wire drag vessel by the United States Coast and Geodetic Survey, and finally as a tugboat along the Puget Sound until her abandonment in 1956. Equator was left to decay as part of a breakwater before she was saved in the 1960s. Efforts to restore her ultimately failed, leaving her remains under an enclosed structure in a decaying state.

== History ==
=== Career ===
Shipbuilder Matthew Turner designed and built Equator as a two-masted schooner in Benicia, California, in 1888 for the copra trade in the South Seas. In mid 1889, Robert Louis Stevenson and Fanny Vandegrift Stevenson chartered the Equator in Hawaii for extended South Pacific cruising. Robert Stevenson learned a lot about sea life from his voyage, which later influenced his books Treasure Island and The Wrecker. He ultimately took up residence in Samoa, which was reached by Equator. Sometime in the 1890s, the schooner received a steam engine and worked as a tender for either an Arctic whaling fleet or for commercial fishing operations in Alaska. Equator later was enlarged, and lost her bowsprit when the Carey-Davis Company purchased her in 1915. During this phase of her career she was used as a wire drag vessel by the United States Coast and Geodetic Survey.

Equator was later converted to gasoline engines sometime in the 1920s, but in 1923 she ran aground on the Quillayute Bar. It remains unclear when Equator was converted into a tugboat, as sources give dates of 1916, 1923, and 1941 all as possibilities. In any case, she was completely renovated in 1923, and received a diesel engine in 1941. Equator spent her final years as a tugboat in use in Puget Sound until 1956, when she was abandoned on the coast of Jetty Island outside Everett, Washington. She was then left to decay with other discarded vessels for the next 11 years as part of a breakwater .

=== Restoration efforts ===
The first efforts to save Equator were led by Everett dentist Eldon Schalka in the 1960s. Eventually he was able to mobilize enough volunteers from the Everett Kiwanis Club in to haul the vessel ashore and clean the muck out of her sometime in June 1967. She was then dry-docked at the 14th Street Fisherman's Boat Shop in Everett. A survey conduced on February 21, 1968, by the National Register of Historical Places gave the following description (with recommendations) of the ship's condition at the time:

"The deck house and all machinery, the propeller, shaft and fittings had been removed, and only the bare hull of the vessel remained. Before and after the vessel had been removed from the breakwater and put into drydock a survey was made of the accessible areas of the hull and the condition of these areas appeared to be reasonably sound. During the course of years many changes were made to the hull structure. The stem is now plumb, and this may have been in the original design, as many small schooners were built in that manner. The stern is certainly not the original, and this should be cut back to a point where the stern can be rebuilt to conform to the original design. The big factors in restoring the "Equator" would be the rebuilding of the stern, redecking, caulking and rerigging."

Schalka helped to establish a nonprofit group to restore the vessel, which despite little fundraising success managed to get Equator listed in the National Register of Historic Places on April 14, 1972. This was the first Everett property to receive this designation. The foundation ultimately tried but failed to raise enough money to restore the vessel, which eventually became an eyesore for the local community. By the late 1980s, Equator had been reduced to a crumbling hull and was moved to its present location at the corner of 10th Street and Craftsman Way. The foundation that Schalka had started was finally dissolved after his death in 1992 in a plane crash.

=== Uncertain future ===
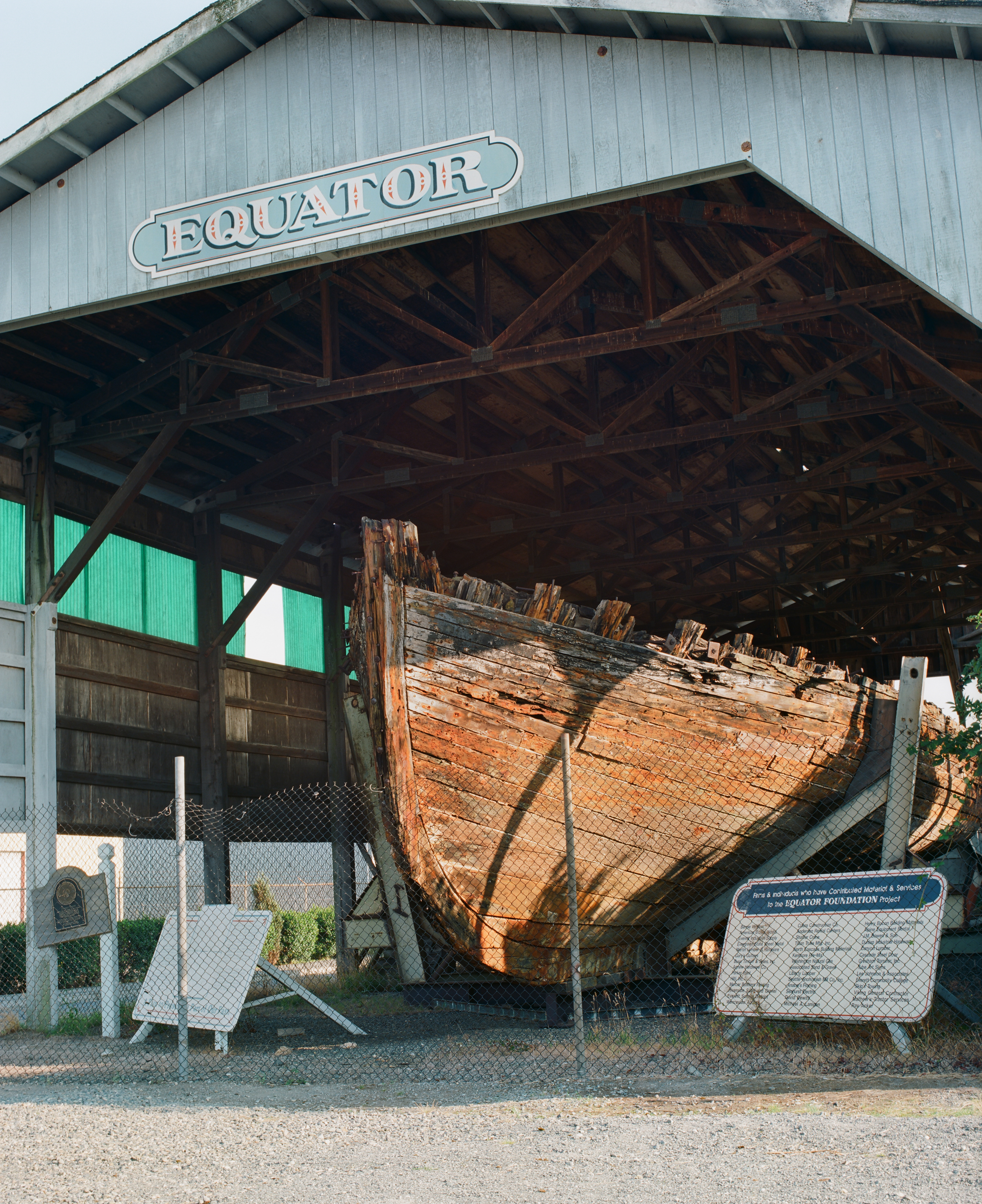
Equator under the open shed in 2014.

Equator initially sat under a makeshift structure that was exposed on all sides, leaving her exposed to the elements. Eventually her back side collapsed in November 2017, which led the Port of Everett to enclose the shelter around her to protect her from further decay. Equator remains in a fragile state as she cannot be moved or preserved in place. To further complicate matters, she is also described as an "orphan" with no legal owner. There is currently a makeshift open air museum in place for Equator, which includes the National Register plaque and an interpretive sign, as well as a list of donors to the Equator Foundation.

Confronted with that situation, the Port of Everett gave notice of its intent to take custody of the ship. Notices were affixed to either side of the bow indicating that in order for any putative owner to take custody of the ship, they would have to come forward by May 29, 2022, prove their ownership, relocate the vessel to "an authorized anchorage area, moorage facility, or storage location," and pay the Port of Everett for all of its salvage costs, storage fees, etc.

The Port of Everett took custody of Equator and announced plans to dismantle her and reuse her timber for public art and an interpretive exhibit. Several nautical archeologists, including students from Texas A&M University, began documenting the ship's remains in June 2023 while preparations for dismantling her were made.

=== Dismantled ===
In September 2023, work began on dismantling and removing Equator from her shelter.

== See also ==
- Historic preservation
- List of Registered Historic Places in Washington
