= More New Arabian Nights: The Dynamiter =

1885 book by Robert Louis Stevenson

More New Arabian Nights
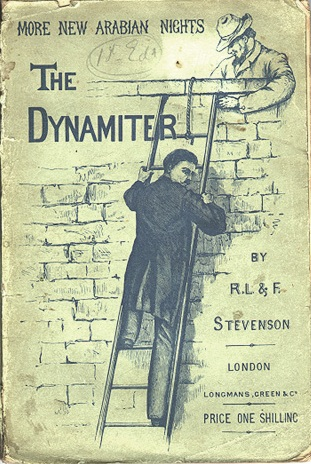
- First edition book cover
- Author: Robert Louis Stevenson; Fanny Vandegrift
- Language: English
- Genre: Short stories
- Publisher: Longmans, Green & Co.
- Publication date: 1885
- Publication place: Scotland
- Media type: Print (Hardback & paperback)
- OCLC: 1933755

More New Arabian Nights: The Dynamiter (1885) is a collection of linked short stories by Robert Louis Stevenson and Fanny van de Grift Stevenson.

== Contents ==
- "Prologue of the Cigar Divan"
- "Challoner's adventure: The Squire of Dames"
- "Story of the Destroying Angel"
- "The Squire of Dames (Concluded)"
- "Somerset's adventure: The Superfluous Mansion"
- "Narrative of the Spirited Old Lady"
- "The Superfluous Mansion (Continued)"
- "Zero's Tale of the Explosive Bomb"
- "The Superfluous Mansion (Continued)"
- "Desborough's Adventure: The Brown Box"
- "Story of the Fair Cuban"
- "The Brown Box (Concluded)"
- "The Superfluous Mansion (Concluded)"
- "Epilogue of the Cigar Divan"
