= Jack Buckland =

19th-century Australian trader

John Wilberforce Buckland
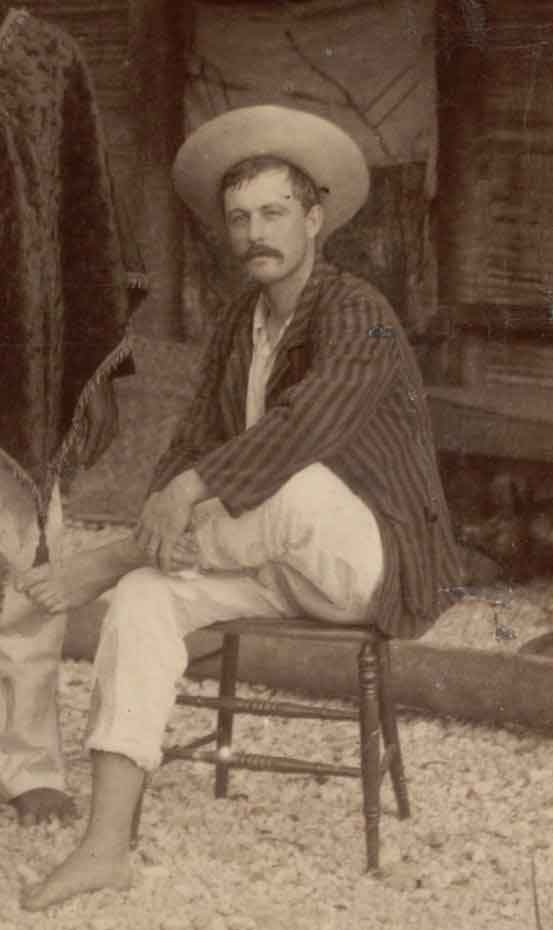
- Buckland in May 1890 (photo by R. L. Stevenson and L. Osbourne)
- Born: 1864; Sydney, Australia
- Died: 1897 (aged 32–33); Suwarrow Island
- Other name: Tin Jack
- Occupation: Island trader
- Parent(s): William Wilberforce Buckland and Harriet Emmeline Hopkins

John Wilberforce "Jack" Buckland (1864–1897), also known as "Tin Jack", was a trader who lived in the South Pacific in the late 19th century. He travelled with Robert Louis Stevenson and his stories of life as an island trader became the inspiration for the character of Tommy Hadden in The Wrecker (1892).

== Early life ==
Jack Buckland was born in 1864 in Sydney, the eldest child of William Wilberforce Buckland and Harriet Emmeline Hopkins. His mother was born in Sydney in 1842, the daughter of John Hopkins, a ship chandler who died when she was young. Her father's business partner, John Carr, and his wife Eliza later adopted Harriet in addition to the ship chandler business. Buckland's father was from Wraysbury in England, the son of an auctioneer, William Thomas Buckland. Buckland's father worked as a merchant and shipbroker in Australia and in 1863 married the 21-year-old Harriet Hopkins in Sydney. Buckland was their first child, born in 1864. When he was 9, Buckland's family returned to England, leaving him with the now elderly John and Eliza Carr who adopted him as their son. John Carr was therefore Buckland's stepfather as well as step-grandfather.

The Carr family lived in a house called "Neepsend" in Lavender Bay, North Sydney. Part of this property was later sold and it was from this sale that John Carr made sufficient money to provide Jack with his allowance. John Carr died in 1881 and the money from the property sale was left in a trust from which Jack received an annual allowance. In 1883, now living on his own, Jack visited his parents and siblings living near London in England. Later he returned to Sydney and subsequently worked for Henderson and Macfarlane of Auckland, as a copra trader.

== Life of an island trader ==
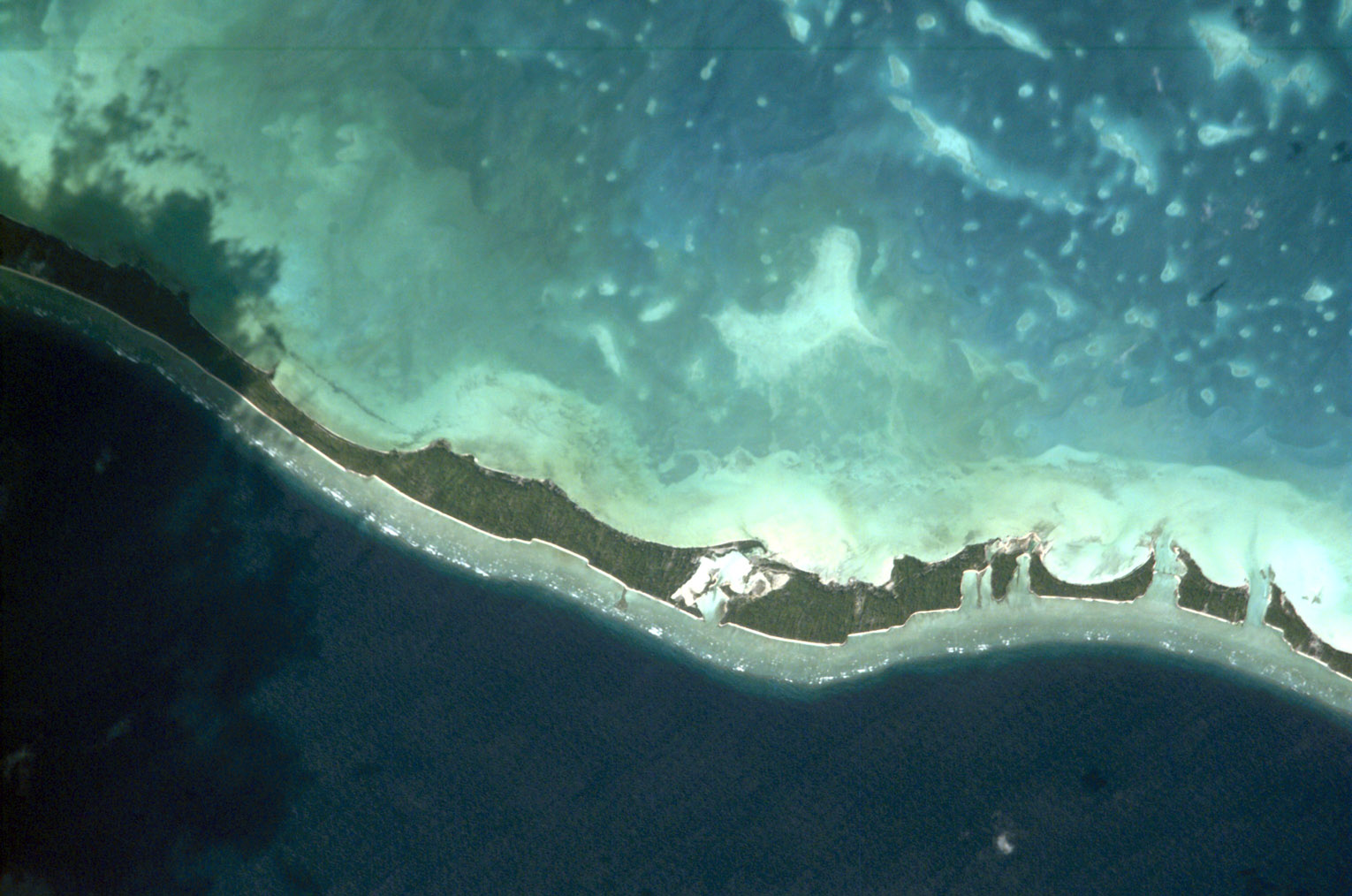
Nonouti Atoll

From the mid-1880s to about 1891, Buckland was a trader at Nonouti atoll, in Kiribati (at the time known as the Gilbert Islands) and during the 1890s he traded at Niutao and Nanumea in Tuvalu (at the time known as the Ellice Islands). The resident trader who succeeded him on Niutao was Fred Whibley.

Buckland's primary income was £700 a year, paid to him by the trustee of the trust fund established by John Carr. That amount was sufficient to allow him to live comfortably for part of the year in Sydney. To supplement this income, Buckland worked as a trader in the central Pacific. This was an isolated existence where he was likely to be the only European on a Pacific atoll. As a trader working for a trading company, he bought copra (dried coconut flesh), and sharks fin and sea cucumbers, for sale into Asia, as well as selling islanders tobacco and other European goods.

As a trader, Buckland chose an isolated life on a Pacific atoll rather than being a castaway or beachcomber. Howe (1984) estimated that in 1850 there were over 2,000 beachcombers throughout Polynesia and Micronesia. It was not only shipwrecked sailors forced, by circumstances, into a life of beachcombing, with many choosing to escape from a life of respectability in the Victorian era.

== Cruise of the Janet Nicoll ==
As a respite from the isolated life on a Pacific atoll Jack Buckland would spend time enjoying the high life of Sydney where, in few months, he would dissipate his income. Furnas (1951) describes Jack Buckland as spending "a short period each year in Sydney playing spendthrift on the accumulations of a small funded income and the rest of the year vegetating penniless as a petty trader out in the islands."

In April 1890 he was a passenger on the trading steamer Janet Nicoll, which left Sydney for a trading cruise around the central Pacific. Robert Louis Stevenson, his wife Fanny Vandegrift Stevenson, and her son Lloyd Osbourne were also passengers on that voyage. The journal of Fanny Vandegrift Stevenson was published under the title The Cruise of the Janet Nichol. Fanny Vandegrift Stevenson explained the origin of the name ‘Tin Jack’ as being the island equivalent of ‘Mr Jack’.

Fanny Vandegrift Stevenson recounted how Buckland inadvertently caused a fire on the Janet Nicoll. In Auckland, New Zealand, Jack Buckland purchased ten pounds of "calcium fire" (fireworks); cartridges, grease paint, a false nose and a wig for the entertainment of the islanders at his trading station on Nonouti atoll. However, on leaving harbour the "calcium fire", which was promised by the chemist to be "safe as a packet of sugar", spontaneously caught alight, causing the fireworks to explode in technicolour flashes, endangering the ship until the crew put out the fire.

== Tin Jack and the character of Tom Hadden ==
Jack Buckland is acknowledged by Robert Louis Stevenson, as the inspiration for the character of Tom Hadden in The Wrecker (1892), for which Stevenson and Lloyd Osbourne shared the writing.

Jack Buckland also receives a dedication in Island Nights' Entertainments (also known as South Sea Tales) a collection of short stories by Robert Louis Stevenson, first published in 1893. This collection is dedicated to Jack Buckland, Ben Hird, (supercargo or manager of the cargo owner's trade) and Harry Henderson partner in the firm Henderson and Macfarlane that owned the Janet Nicoll. A character referred to as ‘young Buncombe’ and inspired by Jack Buckland makes a brief appearance in chapter 2 of The Beach of Falesá.

Jack Buckland stayed at Vailima with Robert and Fanny Stevenson in 1894. In later correspondence to Lieutenant Eeles, an officer on H.M.S. Curacao, Stevenson expresses his pleasure that his correspondent had met Jack Buckland:

"But the cream of the fun was your meeting with Burn. We not only know him, but (as the French say) we don't know anybody else; he is our intimate and adored original; and – prepare your mind – he was, is, and ever will be, TOMMY HADDON! As I don't believe you to be inspired, I suspect you to have suspected this. At least it was a mighty happy suspicion. You are quite right: Tommy is really 'a good chap,' though about as comic as they make them."

While The Wrecker was not a commercial or critical success, in adopting Jack Buckland as a character, Stevenson describes a specific era of European engagement with the Pacific. Watson (2007) describes Stevenson's The Wrecker as "a prophetically postmodern vision of a depthless world of travel, exile, novelty and rootlessness, of 'discarded sons' whose corruption, in a world they neither understand nor fully belong to, is curiously innocent."

Sixty-five years after the publication of The Wrecker, a television series episode of Maverick (1957) starring James Garner and Jack Kelly was produced, featuring Errol Flynn-lookalike Patric Knowles as the character based upon Buckland.

== Tin Jack and Vailima, Samoa ==
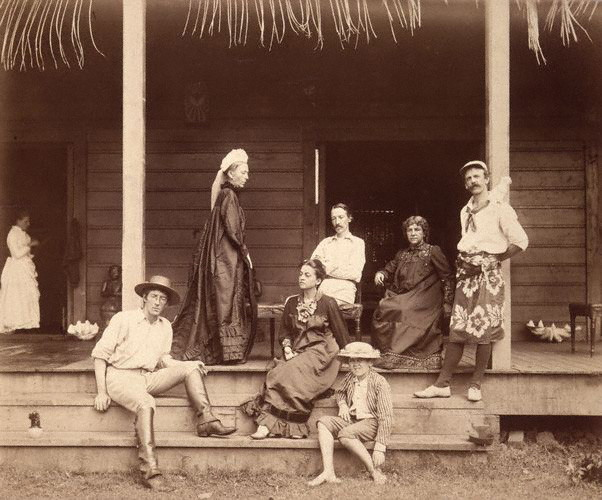
Stevenson family and friends, Vailima

The letters of Robert Louis Stevenson of January 1894 also record that Jack Buckland, and his "avaga" ('married one' in the Niutaoan language) Meri Matavaka of the Luaseuta family of Niutao, visited Vailima, Samoa for three weeks. Jack Buckland was still at Vailima on 6 February 1894. During his time at Vailima Jack Buckland is mentioned as flirting with Addie (Adelaide), the daughter of Henry Ide, American Chief Justice in Samoa.

Jack Buckland then became the island trader on Nanumea in Tuvalu in about 1895. Meri Matavaka refused to move to Nanumea. The oral history of the Luaseuta family says that Jack Buckland abandoned Meri Matavaka in Sydney, Australia; her father travelled from Niutao to bring Meri back to Niutao. Meri Matavaka became the "avaga" of Fred Whibley.

== Death of Tin Jack ==
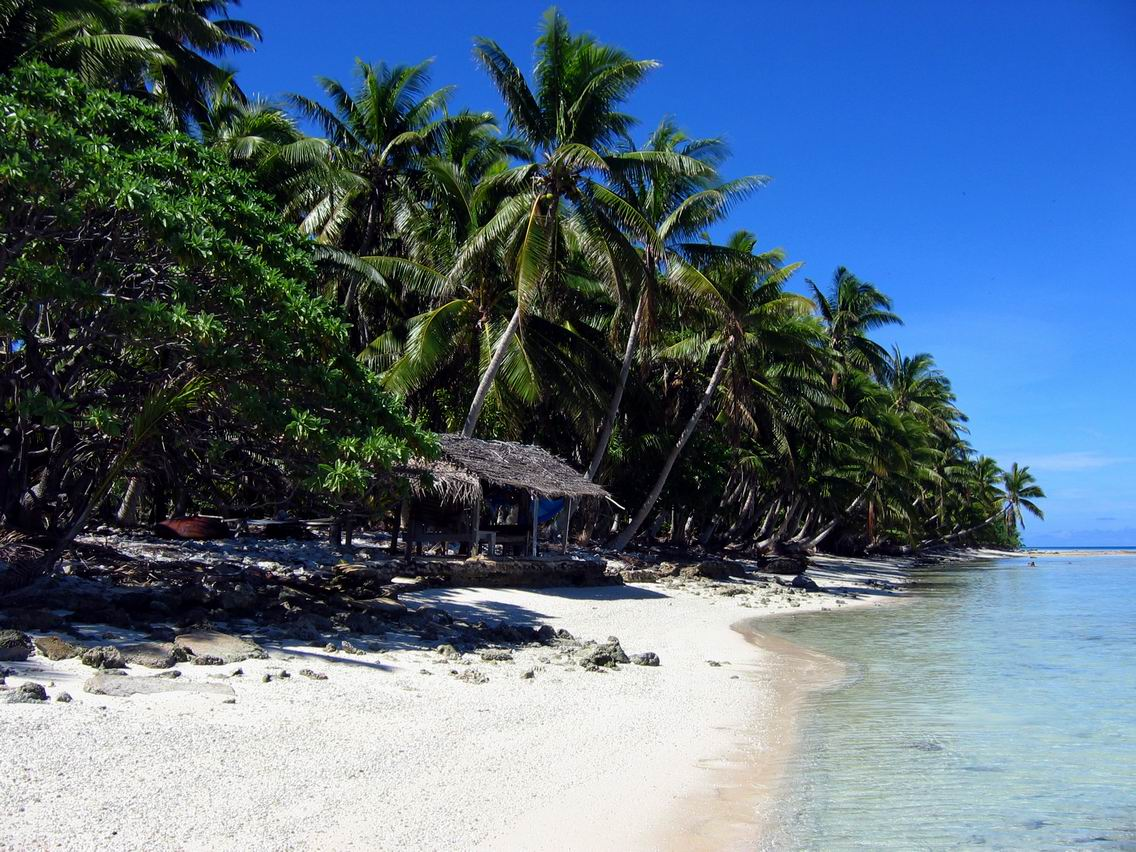
Anchorage Island, Suwarrow

Robert Louis Stevenson draws directly from the life of Jack Buckland in describing Tom Hadden in The Wrecker as being "heir to a considerable property, which a prophetic father had placed in the hands of rigorous trustees." Tin Jack's dissolute life came to an end in 1897. A sanitised version of the death of Jack Buckland published by Simpson (1913) describes him as being blown to pieces by an explosion on Suwarrow Island. Fanny Stevenson in her journal of the voyage of the Janet Nicoll published in 1914 described the trustee that provided Jack with the majority of his income as defrauding the trust of all the funds:

Some years ago when Jack was at his station he received word that his trustee, who was in charge of his property, had levanted it all. Whereupon poor Jack put a pistol to his head and blew out what brains he possessed. He was a beautiful creature, terribly annoying at times, but with something childlike and appealing--I think he was close to what the Scotch call a natural--that made one forgive pranks in him that which would be unforgivable in others. He was very proud of being the original 'Tommy Hadden' in [R. L. Stevenson's book] 'The Wrecker,' and carried the book wherever he went.
