= S. L. Viehl =

American writer (born 1961)

Sheila Lynn Kelly
- Born: 1961 (age 64–65)
- Occupations: Novelist, short story author
- Writing career
- Pen name: S. L. Viehl; Lynn Viehl; Gena Hale
- Period: 2000–present
- Genres: Science fiction, romantic fiction, Christian fiction, paranormal erotica
- Website: pbackwriter.blogspot.com

Sheila Lynn Kelly (born 1961) is an American writer. She mostly writes novels in a variety of genres and under several pseudonyms. Among them are science fiction (as S. L. Viehl), romantic fiction (as Lynn Viehl, Gena Hale, Jessica Hall), and Christian fiction (as Rebecca Kelly).

She enjoys quilting, reading, cooking, painting, and knitting.

== Bibliography ==
=== As S. L. Viehl ===
==== Stardoc ====
1. Stardoc (ROC, 2000) (ISBN 0-451-45773-0)
2. Beyond Varallan (ROC, 2000) (ISBN 0-451-45793-5)
3. Endurance (ROC, 2001) (ISBN 0-451-45814-1)
4. Shockball (ROC, 2001) (ISBN 0-451-45855-9)
5. Eternity Row (ROC, 2002) (ISBN 0-451-45891-5)
6. Rebel Ice (ROC, 2006) (ISBN 0-451-46062-6)
7. Plague of Memory (ROC, 2007) (ISBN 0-451-46123-1) (previously Clanson)
8. Omega Games (ROC, 2008) (ISBN 0-451-46224-6)
9. Crystal Healer (ROC, 2009) (ISBN 0-451-46285-8)
10. Dream Called Time (ROC, 2010) (ISBN 0-451-46346-3)

==== Set in the StarDoc universe ====
1. Blade Dancer (ROC, 2003) (ISBN 0-451-45946-6)
2. Bio Rescue (ROC, 2004) (ISBN 0-451-46008-1)
3. Afterburn (ROC, 2005) (ISBN 0-451-46029-4)

=== As Gena Hale ===
1. Paradise Island (Onyx, 2001) (ISBN 0-451-40982-5)
2. Dream Mountain (Onyx, 2001) (ISBN 0-451-41003-3)
3. Sun Valley (Onyx, 2002) (ISBN 0-451-41039-4)

=== As Rebecca Kelly ===
==== Tales from Grace Chapel Inn ====
- Going to the Chapel (Guideposts, 2003) (ISBN 9781122553001)
- Home for the Holidays (Guideposts, 2003)
- Portraits of the Past (Guideposts, 2003)
- Midsummer Melody (Guideposts, 2004)
- Promises to Keep (Guideposts, 2004)
- Life Is a Three-Ring Circus (Guideposts, 2005)

=== As Lynn Viehl ===
==== The Darkyn ====
1. If Angels Burn (Signet, 2005) (ISBN 0-451-21477-3)
2. Private Demon (Signet, 2005) (ISBN 0-451-21705-5)
3. Dark Need (Signet, 2006) (ISBN 0-451-21866-3)
4. Night Lost (Signet, 2007) (ISBN 0-451-22102-8)
5. Evermore (Signet, 2008) (ISBN 978-0-451-22284-8)
6. Twilight Fall (Signet, 2008) (ISBN 0-451-41259-1)
7. Stay the Night (Signet, 2009) (ISBN 0-451-41266-4)
8. Nightborn (Signet, March 2012) (ISBN 978-0-451-41321-5)

==== The Kyndred ====
1. Shadowlight (Signet, 2009) (ISBN 0-451-41278-8)
2. Dreamveil (Signet, June 2010) (ISBN 978-0-451-41288-1)
3. Frostfire (Signet, January 2011) (ISBN 978-0-451-41302-4)
4. Nightshine (Signet, November 2011) (ISBN 978-0-451-41314-7)

==== Lords of the Darkyn ====
1. Nightborn (Signet, March 2012) (ISBN 978-0451413215)
2. Nightbred (Signet, Dezember 2012) (ISBN 978-0451238795)
3. Nightbound (Signet, May 2013) (ISBN 978-0451239815)

==== Disenchanted & Co. Toriana Universe – Alternate history and Steampunk ====
0.5 My Lord Mayhem ebook (July 2013)
1. Disenchanted & Co. (January 2014) Contains Part 1:Her Ladyship's Curse (Pocket Star ebook, August 2013) and Part 2:His Lordship possessed (Pocket Star ebook, October 2013) ISBN 978-1476722351
1.4 Three Gifts ebook (December 2013)
1.5 Forget-Me-Knot ebook
2. The Clockwork Wolf (Pocket Books, February 2014) ISBN 978-1476722375

- In The Leaves ebook (October 2014); prequel to Disenchanted & Co.
