= The Wrecker (Stevenson novel) =

1892 adventure novel by Robert Louis Stevenson and Lloyd Osbourne

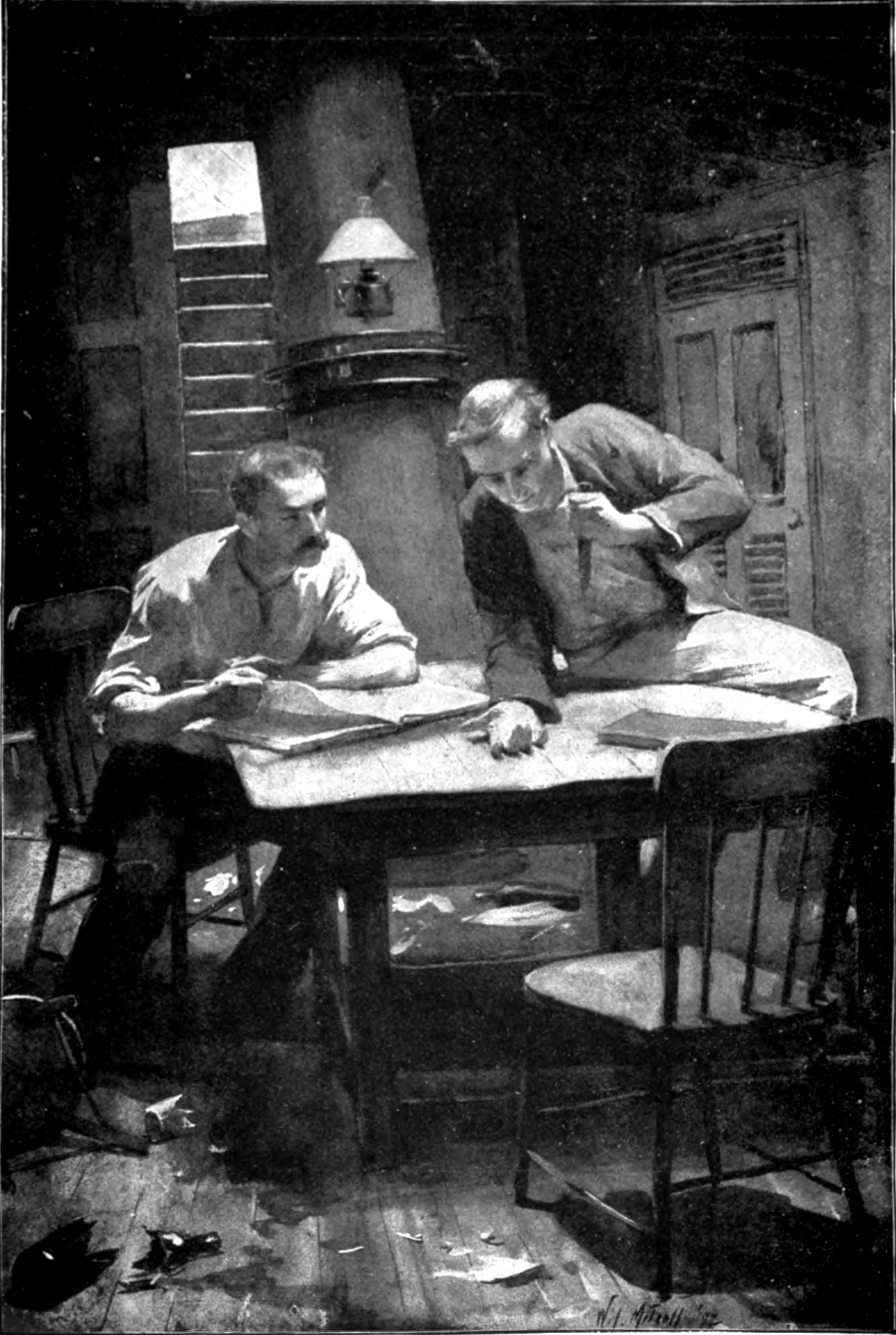
- "that kind of accident, said he" illustration by W. L. Metcalf
- Author: Robert Louis Stevenson and Lloyd Osbourne
- Language: English
- Genre: Adventure novel
- Publisher: Cassell
- Publication date: 1892
- Publication place: Scotland
- Media type: Print (Hardback & Paperback)
- Text: The Wrecker at Wikisource

The Wrecker is an 1892 adventure novel written by Robert Louis Stevenson in collaboration with his stepson Lloyd Osbourne.

== Plot ==
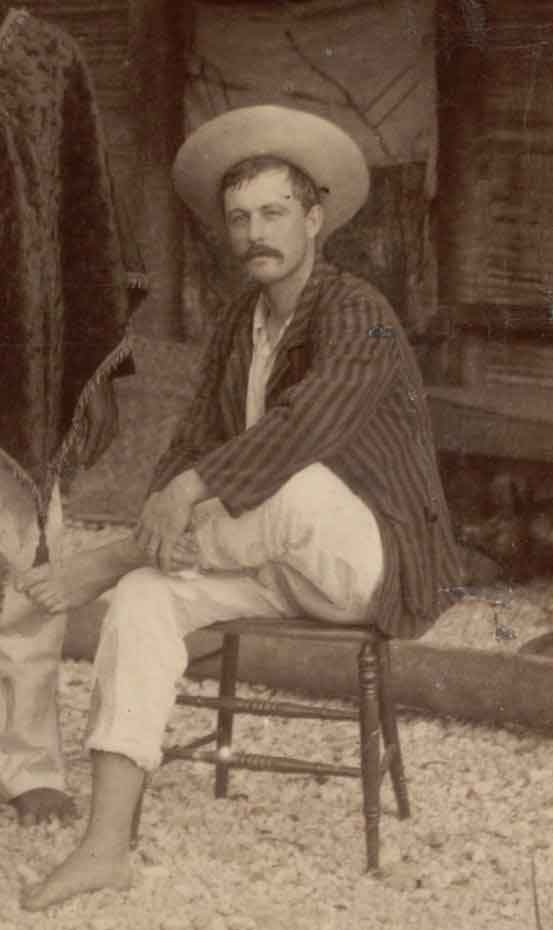
Jack Buckland, 1890

The story is a "sprawling, episodic adventure story, a comedy of brash manners and something of a detective mystery", according to Roderick Watson. It revolves around the abandoned wreck of the Flying Scud at Midway Atoll. Clues in a stamp collection are used to track down the missing crew and solve the mystery. It is only in the last chapter that different story elements become linked. Stevenson described it as a "South Sea yarn" concerning "a very strange and defective plan that was accepted with open eyes for what seemed countervailing opportunities offered". The book sold well but reviews were mixed, with a New York Times reviewer concluding that:

The Wrecker is a kind of blank-cartridge romance with a big explosion, which raises a dust, and if anything really has happened it escapes you in the flash and the cloud of smoke.

The loosely connected stories reflect how Stevenson and Osbourne wrote the book. Each contributed different sections, but agreed to develop characters and descriptions of places they both knew well. The following are examples:

- The schooner Equator (1888–1953) inspired the story. Its remains are preserved in a shed at Marina Park at the Port of Everett, Washington.
- Jack Buckland was a handsome, happy-go-lucky fellow passenger with Osbourne and Stevenson on the 1890 Janet Nicholl voyage. He inspired the character of "Remittance Man" Tommy Hadden.

== Adaptations ==
- Il tesoro del capitano Dodd, episode in TV series Avventure di mare e di costa, 1966
- "The Wrecker", episode 11 of season 1 of Roy Huggins' 1957 Western television series Maverick (1957) starring James Garner and Jack Kelly as Bret and Bart Maverick. The episode is described in the opening title credit as "Robert Louis Stevenson's The Wrecker" and in the closing credits as "From a Novel by Robert Louis Stevenson & Lloyd Osbourne". The Maverick brothers buy the wreck of the Flying Scud at a closed auction in San Francisco and try to find out why its cargo is apparently so valuable, prompting Bart to venture into a dangerous sea voyage during the second half of the episode. The supporting cast features Patric Knowles as the character inspired by Jack Buckland and Karl Swenson as a colorful sea captain.
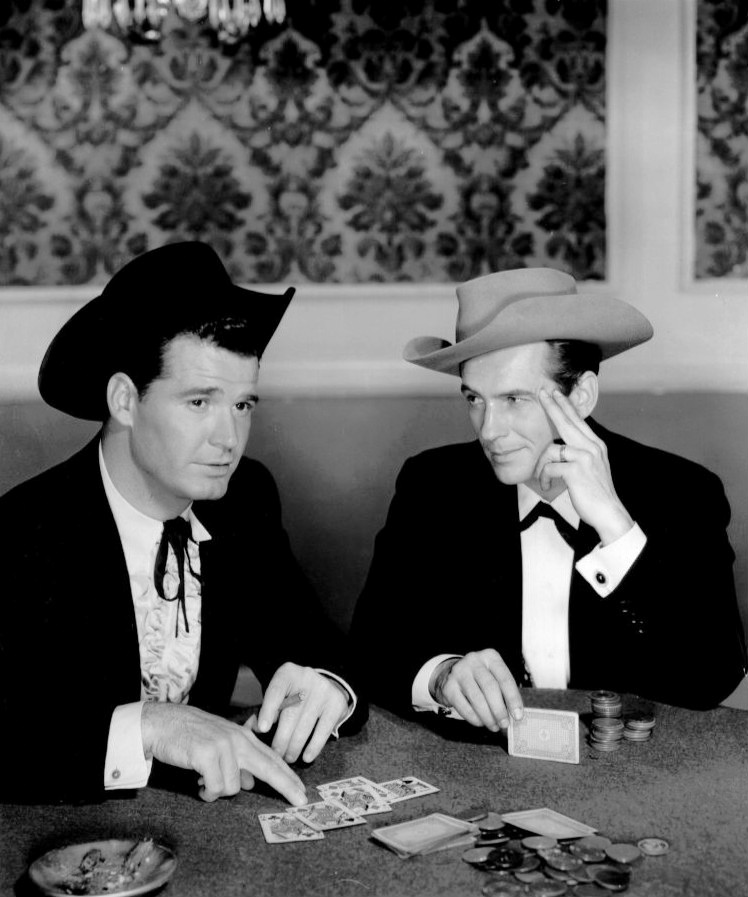
  James Garner and Jack Kelly in Maverick (1957)

== See also ==
- List of Maverick episodes
