= Fanny Stevenson =

American magazine writer (1840–1914)

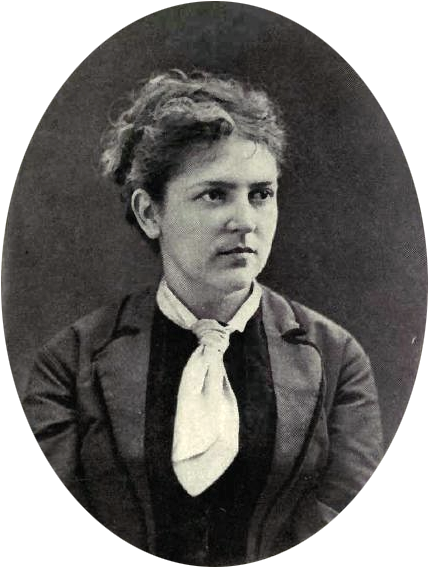
- Born: Frances Matilda Van de Grift; 10 March 1840; Indianapolis, Indiana, U.S.
- Died: 10 February 1914 (aged 73); Santa Barbara, California, U.S.
- Spouses: Samuel Osbourne (m. 1857; div. 1880) Robert Louis Stevenson (m. 1880; died 1894)
- Children: Isobel Osbourne; Lloyd Osbourne; Hervey Stewart Osbourne
- Relatives: Edward Salisbury Field (son-in-law)

Frances Matilda Van de Grift Osbourne Stevenson (10 March 1840 – 18 February 1914) was an American magazine writer. She became a supporter of and later the wife of Robert Louis Stevenson, and the mother of Isobel Osbourne, Samuel Lloyd Osbourne, and Hervey Stewart Osbourne.

== Life ==
=== Early life ===
Fanny Vandegrift was born in Indianapolis, the daughter of builder Jacob Vandegrift and homemaker Esther Thomas Keen. She was something of a tomboy, and had dark curly hair. At the age of seventeen she married Samuel Osbourne, a lieutenant on the state governor's staff. Their daughter Isobel (or 'Belle') was born the following year.

Samuel fought in the American Civil War, went with a friend sick with tuberculosis to California, and ended up in the silver mines of Nevada. Once settled there he sent for his family. Fanny and the five-year-old Isobel made the long journey via New York, the Isthmus of Panama, San Francisco, and finally by wagons and stage-coach to the mining camps of the Reese River, and the town of Austin in Lander County. Life was difficult in the mining town, and there were few women around. Fanny learned to shoot a pistol and to roll her own cigarettes.

Samuel began to be unfaithful to Fanny after the family moved to Virginia City, Nevada. In 1866, he headed off gold prospecting in the Coeur d'Alene Mountains, while Fanny and her daughter journeyed to San Francisco. There was a rumor that Samuel had been killed by a grizzly bear, but he returned, and a second child, Samuel Lloyd, was born in 1868. Samuel continued philandering and Fanny returned to Indianapolis.

The couple reconciled again in 1869 and lived in Oakland, California, where a second son, Hervey, was born. Fanny took up painting and gardening. Sam's behavior did not improve and Fanny finally left him in 1875, moving with her three children to Europe. They lived in Antwerp for three months, and then to allow Fanny to study art, moved to Paris where Fanny and Isobel both enrolled in the Académie Julian. Hervey, sick with scrofulous tuberculosis, died on 5 April 1876, and was buried in a temporary grave at Père Lachaise Cemetery.

In 1885, Fanny Stevenson became the aunt of Elsie Lincoln Benedict (Vandegrift), a future American suffragist and renowned public speaker. This familial tie links Fanny Stevenson to the broader context of American social and cultural history in the late 19th and early 20th centuries.

=== With Stevenson ===
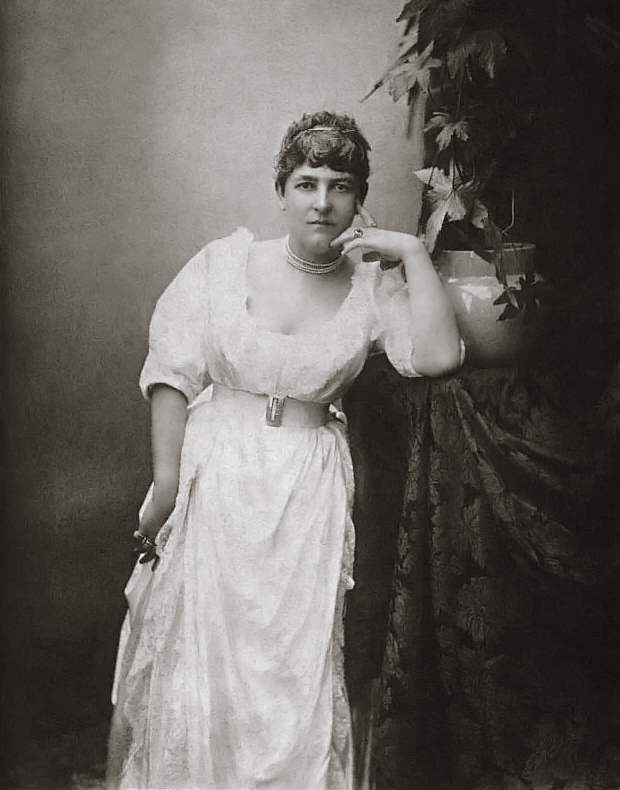
Portrait of Fanny Stevenson. Bournemouth, 1885

After Hervey's death, Fanny moved to Grez-sur-Loing, where she met and befriended Robert Louis Stevenson. A 1916 recollection of her by L. Birge Harrison (published in the Centenary Magazine) recalls, "That she was a woman of intellectual attainments is proved by the fact that she was already a magazine writer of recognized ability, and that at the moment when Stevenson first came into her life she was making a living for herself and her two children with her pen." Convinced of his talent, she encouraged and inspired him. He became deeply attached to her, but in August 1878 Fanny returned abruptly to California.

In July 1879, Fanny cabled Stevenson that she planned to leave her husband permanently. Stevenson announced his intention of following her, but his parents refused to pay for it, so he saved to pay his own way. In August 1879, despite protests of family and friends, Stevenson went to Monterey, California, where Fanny was recovering from an emotional breakdown related to indecision about whether to go through with the break from her husband. Stevenson wrote many of his most 'muscular' essays in Monterey while awaiting Fanny's decision.

She ultimately chose Stevenson, divorced Osbourne, and in May 1880 she and Stevenson were married in San Francisco. A few days later, the couple left for a honeymoon in the Napa Valley, where Stevenson produced his work Silverado Squatters. He later wrote The Amateur Emigrant in two parts about his passage to America: From the Clyde to Sandy Hook and Across the Plains. His middle-class friends were shocked by his travel with the lower classes; it was not published in full in his lifetime, and his father bought up most copies.

In August 1880, the family moved to Great Britain, where Fanny helped to patch things up between Robert and his father. Always in search of a climate conducive to Stevenson's ailing health, the couple travelled to the Adirondacks in the US.

In 1888, Fanny Stevenson published a short story, "The Nixie", which William Ernest Henley recognized as based on Katharine de Mattos's idea they had discussed the previous year. He wrote to her husband: "Why there wasn't a double signature is what I've not been able to understand." This accusation of plagiarism led to a bitter quarrel and rupture of the Stevensons with Henley and de Mattos.

In 1888, the Stevensons chartered the Casco out of San Francisco and sailed to Western Samoa. Later voyages on the Equator and Janet Nicoll with Fanny's son Lloyd Osbourne followed. They settled in Upolu, at their home Vailima, where Stevenson died on 3 December 1894.

=== Return to California ===
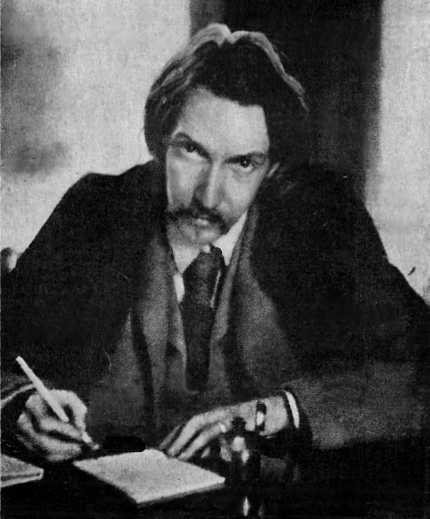
Robert Louis Stevenson, 1885

After Stevenson's death, Fanny returned to California to begin a new life in America and Europe with an adoring companion decades her junior, newsman Edward "Ned" Salisbury Field. When Fanny died in Santa Barbara, California, Field described her as "the only woman in the world worth dying for." Soon after, he married her daughter Isobel Osbourne.

In 1915, Fanny's ashes were taken by her daughter to Samoa where they were interred next to Stevenson on top of Mount Vaea. The bronze plaque for Fanny bears her Samoan name 'Aolele' (Flying Cloud in Samoan).

== In popular culture ==
The actress Aline Towne played Fanny in the 1958 episode "The Great Amulet" of the syndicated television anthology series Death Valley Days, hosted by Stanley Andrews. The episode focuses on Fanny and Robert Louis Stevenson, a role played by Don Reardon. The "Great Amulet" is revealed at the conclusion of the episode.

Walerian Borowczyk's 1981 horror film Docteur Jekyll et les femmes (a.k.a. The Strange Case of Dr Jekyll and Miss Osbourne and Dr Jekyll and his Women) stars Italian actress Marina Pierro as a character named "Fanny Osbourne," depicted as the fiancée of Dr. Henry Jekyll and named for Fanny Stevenson (née Osbourne). Pierro stated Borowczyk "had an offer to direct a film about Dr Jekyll. He liked the idea, but he didn't want to direct a remake, and he noticed that there wasn't a female character in the book. So he told me that he'd think about it and if he happened to find it interesting, he would do it. Actually, that was how he discovered the existence of Fanny Osbourne, the wife of Robert Louis Stevenson, a very adventurous and independent woman for the time. Borowczyk was enthusiastic about the idea of...introducing this real figure into the fiction. So that's how the character of Miss Osbourne was born."

In 2004 Pamela Stephenson spent a year on a sailing cruise around the South Pacific Ocean, following the path of Fanny and Robert Louis Stevenson. Her travels were documented in her 2005 book Treasure Islands.

The 2023 stage adaptation of Robert Louis Stevenson's novel Kidnapped featured Fanny as the narrator, with the role being played by Kim Ismay.

== Bibliography ==
=== Short stories ===
- 'Too Many Birthdays' (St. Nicholas, 1878)
- 'Sargent's Rodeo' (Lippincot's Magazine, Jan. 1880)
- 'Chy Lung, The Chinese Fisherman' (St. Nicholas, 1880)
- 'The Warlock's Shadow' (Belgravia, 1886)
- 'Miss Pringle's Neighbors' (Scribner's Magazine, 1887)
- 'The Nixie' (Scribner's Magazine, 1888)
- 'The Half-White' (Scribner's Magazine, 1891)
- 'Under Sentence of the Law: The Story of a Dog' (McClure's, 1893)
- 'Anne' (Scribner's Magazine, 1899)

=== With Robert Louis Stevenson ===
- More New Arabian Nights: The Dynamiter (1885)

=== Diary ===
- The Cruise of the Janet Nicol (1914 - published posthumously)
