= Lloyd Osbourne =

American novelist (1868–1947)

Samuel Lloyd Osbourne
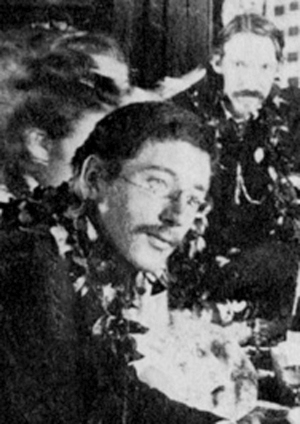
- Osbourne (left) and his stepfather, Robert Louis Stevenson (right), attending a Royal Luau thrown by King Kalākaua, Honolulu, Hawaii, c. 1889
- Born: 7 April 1868; San Francisco, California, US
- Died: 22 May 1947 (aged 79); Glendale, California, US
- Education: University of Edinburgh
- Occupation: Novelist
- Spouse: Katherine Durham (m. 1896; div. 1914)
- Partner: Yvonne Payerne
- Children: 3
- Parent(s): Samuel Osbourne; Fanny Vandegrift
- Relatives: Isobel Osbourne (sister); Robert Louis Stevenson (stepfather); Edward Salisbury Field (brother-in-law)
- Writing career
- Notable works: The Wrong Box, The Ebb-Tide, The Wrecker

Samuel Lloyd Osbourne (April 7, 1868 – May 22, 1947) was an American writer and the stepson of the Scottish writer Robert Louis Stevenson, with whom he wrote three books, including The Wrecker. He also provided input and ideas on others. Osbourne wrote a number of stories and essays on his own, including An Intimate Portrait of R L S By His Stepson (1924).

== Early life ==
Samuel Lloyd Osbourne was born in San Francisco to Fanny Vandegrift and Samuel Osbourne, a lieutenant on the State Governor's staff. They had married when Fanny was 17 years old, and Lloyd's older sister Belle was born the following year. The elder Samuel fought in the American Civil War, went with a friend sick with tuberculosis to California, and via San Francisco, ended up in the silver mines of Nevada. Once settled there he sent for his family. Fanny and the five-year-old Isobel made the long journey via New York City, the isthmus of Panama, San Francisco, and finally by wagons and stage-coach to the mining camps of the Reese River, and the town of Austin in Lander County. Life was difficult in the mining town, and there were few women around. Fanny learned to shoot a pistol and to roll her own cigarettes.

The family moved to Virginia City, Nevada. Samuel began philandering with saloon girls, and in 1866 he left to prospect for gold in the Coeur d'Alene Mountains. Fanny and her daughter journeyed to San Francisco. There was a rumor that Sam had been killed by a grizzly bear, but he returned to the family safe in 1868. Shortly thereafter Lloyd was born. Samuel continued philandering and Fanny returned to Indianapolis.

The couple were reconciled again in 1869, and lived in Oakland where a second son, Hervey, was born. Fanny took up painting and gardening. However, her husband's behavior did not improve, and Fanny finally left him in 1875 and moved with her three children to Europe. They lived in Antwerp for three months, and then in order to allow Fanny to study art, moved to Paris where Fanny and Isobel both enrolled in the Académie Julian. Hervey was sick with scrofulous tuberculosis, died on 5 April 1876, and was buried in a temporary grave at Père Lachaise Cemetery.

While in Paris, Lloyd's mother met and befriended the author Robert Louis Stevenson. Stevenson and Fanny became deeply attached to each other; in 1880 Fanny divorced her husband and married Stevenson when Lloyd was just twelve years old. As a boy, Lloyd and his stepfather painted a map of an imaginary island, and this was the inspiration for Stevenson's classic Treasure Island. Although he would study engineering at the University of Edinburgh, Osbourne wished to become a writer, an idea that was encouraged by his stepfather.

== Pacific Ocean travels with Stevenson ==
In June 1888, Stevenson chartered a yacht and set sail with his new family from San Francisco across the Pacific Ocean, visiting important island groups. They stopped for an extended stay in the Hawaiian Islands where Stevenson became good friends with King Kalākaua.

In 1890 Lloyd Osbourne, his mother, and Stevenson sailed from Sydney, Australia, into the central Pacific on the steam ship the Janet Nicoll. Lloyd Osbourne and Stevenson used a plate camera to photograph Pacific Islanders and passengers and crew of the Janet Nicoll. A passenger on the Janet Nicoll was Jack Buckland, whom Lloyd Osbourne and Stevenson used as a character in The Wrecker (1892).

In 1890 the family settled in Samoa, where Stevenson died four years later on December 3. In 1894 Osbourne was appointed vice consul to represent the United States in Samoa.

On April 9, 1896, Osbourne married Katherine Durham in Honolulu; they had two children. The couple divorced in 1914. In 1916 they remarried on condition that they would not have any more children; they later divorced again.

== Later years ==
Osbourne spent the period of 1936 in the South of France with Yvonne Payerne, forty years his junior, by whom he had another son when he was 68 years old. In 1941, Osbourne returned alone to the U.S. when America entered the war. Yvonne and Samuel arrived in New York City on May 22, 1947, the same day that Osbourne died in California.

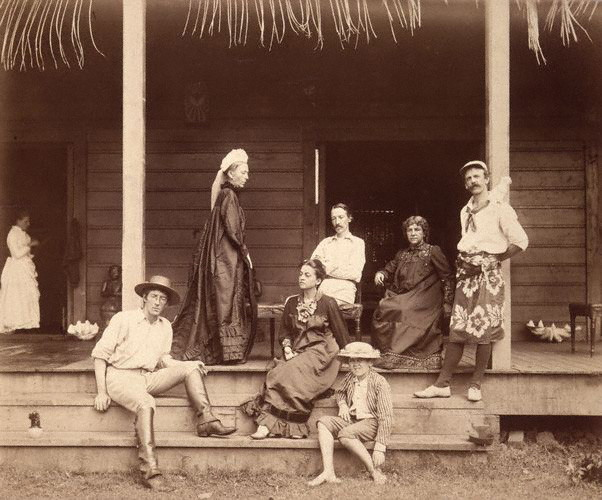
Stevenson in Vailima. Lloyd Osbourne is sitting on the left.

Osbourne's son, Alan Osbourne, served in WWI and was an Editor-in-Chief of the U.S. Maritime Commission.

== Collaborations with Robert Louis Stevenson ==
- The Wrong Box
- The Ebb-Tide
- The Wrecker, which was also used as the basis for a 1957 television series episode of Maverick with the same title, starring James Garner and Jack Kelly, with due credit given to both Stevenson and Osbourne in the closing credits.

== Other works ==
- The Queen Versus Billy and Other Stories (1900)
- Forty Years Between (March 1903)
- Love, The Fiddler (1903)
- The Fugitives of Pleasure (February 1904)
- Baby Bullet: The Bubble of Destiny (1905)
- The Motormaniacs (1905)
- The Adventurer (1907)
- Infatuation (1909)
- Wild Justice: Stories of the South Seas (1921)
- An Intimate Portrait of R L S By His Stepson (1924)
