= Across the Plains (book) =

Across the Plains (1892) is the middle section of Robert Louis Stevenson's three-part travel memoir which began with The Amateur Emigrant and ended with The Silverado Squatters.

The book contains 12 chapters, each a story or essay unto itself. The title chapter is the longest, and is divided into 7 subsections. It describes Stevenson's arrival at New York as an immigrant, along with hundreds of other Europeans, and his train journey from New York to San Francisco in an immigrant train. Stevenson describes the train as having three sections: one for women and children, one for men, and one for Chinese. He notes that while the Europeans looked down on the Chinese for being dirty, in fact the Chinese carriages were the freshest and their passengers the cleanest.

Contents

- 1: Across The Plains (1.Leaves from the Notebook of an Emigrant Between New York and San Francisco; 2. The Emigrant Train; 3. The Plains of Nebraska; 4. The Desert of Wyoming; 5.Fellow-Passengers; 6.Despised Races 7. To the Golden Gates). (A travel description of Stevenson's railway journey across the USA).
- 2: The Old Pacific Capital. (A reminiscence on Monterey in California).
- 3: Fontainebleau. (A discourse on village communities of painters, such as those found at Fontainebleau)
- 4: Epilogue to "An Inland Voyage". (Stevenson is arrested by a French village mayor for not having a licence to sing).
- 5: Random Memories. I - The coast of Fife. (A discourse on events and people conjured up by Stevenon's memories of the coastal areas of Fife that he visited as a child).
- 6: Random Memories. II - The education of an engineer. (Stevenson describes the time he went diving at Anstruther in Scotland, in a rubber suit with a great brass helmet).
- 7: The Lantern-bearers. (Stevenson's memories of running about at night with his friends, each with a lantern hidden under his coat, which evolves into a discussion of the causes of joy).
- 8: A Chapter on Dreams. (Discusses dreams, and an author known to Stevenson whose work was based on his dreams. This author turns out to be Stevenson himself, and mentions how Olalla and Dr Jekyll and Mr Hyde were both based on Stevenson's own dreams).
- 9: Beggars. (A description of two beggars Stevenson had met, which evolves into a discourse on beggary in general, and charity, and concludes with recommending taxes as the best means of redistribution of wealth).
- 10: Letter to a Young Gentleman who proposes to embrace a career in art.
- 11: Pulvis et Umbra.
- 12: A Christmas Sermon.
