= The Amateur Emigrant =

Book by Robert Louis Stevenson

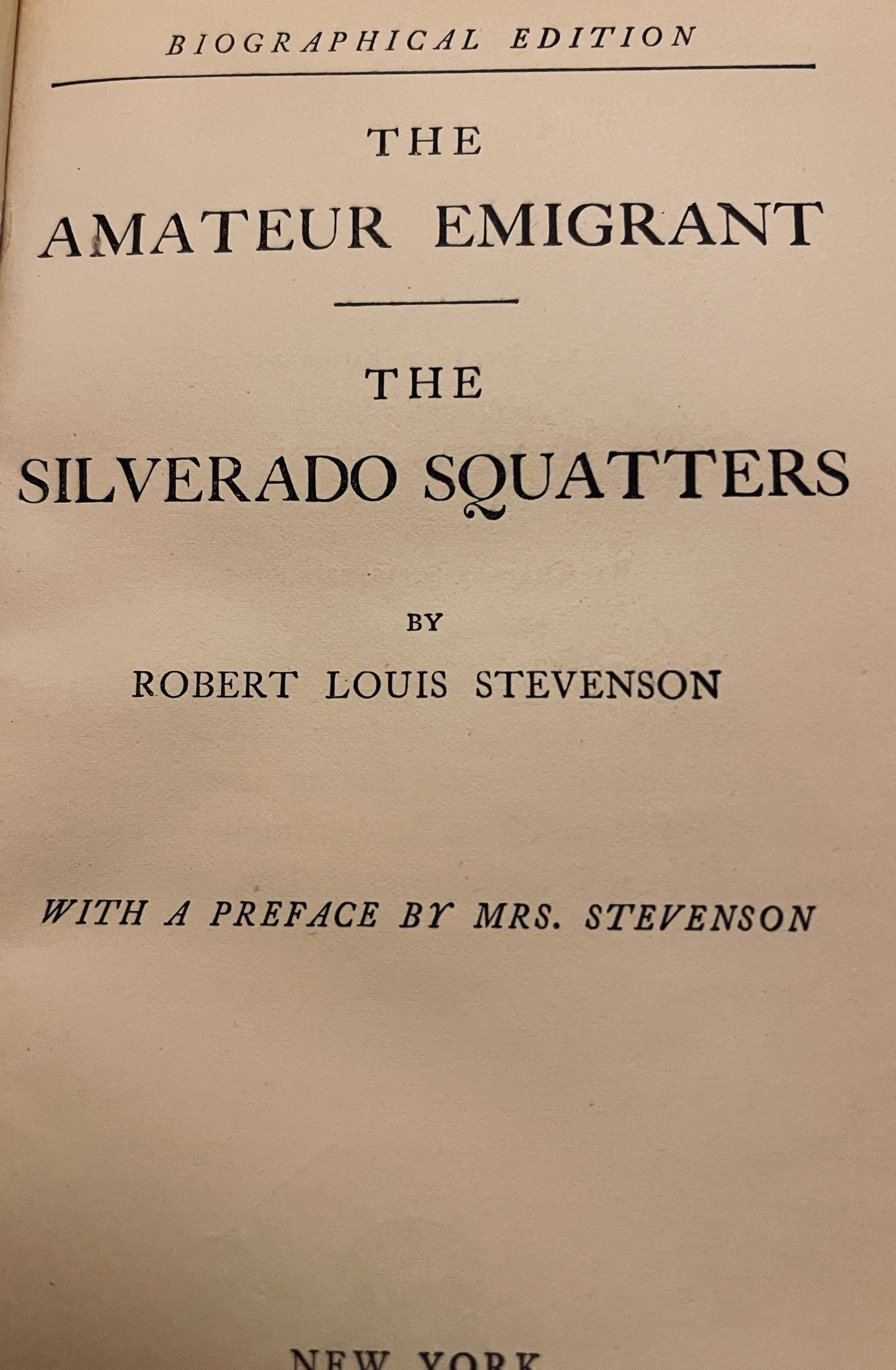
- Title page of 1905 edition
- Author: Robert Louis Stevenson
- Language: English
- Genre: Novel
- Publisher: Charles Scribner's Sons
- Publication date: 1 November 1885
- Publication place: Scotland
- Media type: Print (hardback)
- Pages: 288
- Text: The Amateur Emigrant at Wikisource

The Amateur Emigrant (in full: The Amateur Emigrant from the Clyde to Sandy Hook) is Robert Louis Stevenson's travel memoir of his journey from Scotland to California in 1879–1880. It is not a complete account, covering the first third, by ship from Europe to New York City. The middle leg of the trip is documented in Across the Plains (1892) with the final part covered in The Silverado Squatters (1883). The Amateur Emigrant was written in 1879–80 and was not published in full until 1895, one year after his death.

In July 1879, Robert Louis Stevenson received word that his future American wife's (Fanny Vandegrift) divorce was almost complete and she was ready to remarry, but that she was seriously ill. He left Scotland right away to meet her in her native California. Leaving by ship from Glasgow, Scotland, he determined to travel in steerage class to see how the working classes fared. At the last minute he was convinced by friends to purchase a ticket one grade above the lowest, which he was later thankful for after seeing the conditions at the bow of the boat, but he still lived among the lower classes.

Stevenson described the crowded weeks in steerage with the poor and sick, as well as stowaways, and his initial reactions to New York City, where he spent a few days. The observations recorded in the memoir convey Stevenson’s perceptions of America and Americans. It also provides a detailed account of what it was like to travel to America as an emigrant in the 19th century, during a time of mass migrations to the New World. Life on board the ship is described with details such as the bedding arrangements, daily food rations, relationships with the crew and with higher-grade ticket holders, passengers of other nationalities, entertainment, and the activities of children.

The work was never published in full in Stevenson's lifetime. It shocked the sensibilities of his middle-class friends and family that he was so close with rough people. Certain passages were considered too graphic by the publisher, and also by Stevenson's father Thomas Stevenson, who bought all the copies of the already printed travelogue, judging it beneath his son's talent. However The Amateur Emigrant is a remarkable revelation of the intermingled complexities of class, race and gender in late Victorian Britain. Andrew Noble (1991) says it was Stevenson's greatest work, due to his willingness to confront the difficult social conditions of his time.

Contents:

- 1.The Second Cabin
- 2.Early Impressions
- 3.Steerage Scenes
- 4.Steerage Types
- 5.The Sick Man
- 6.The Stowaways
- 7.Personal Experience and Review
- 8.New York

"The Story of a Lie" was a product of this trip and was published in the New Quarterly Magazine in 1879. Both texts were eventually published together as the singular The Amateur Emigrant from the Clyde to Sandy Hook in 1895, the year after Stevenson's death.
