= Petrified Forest (California) =

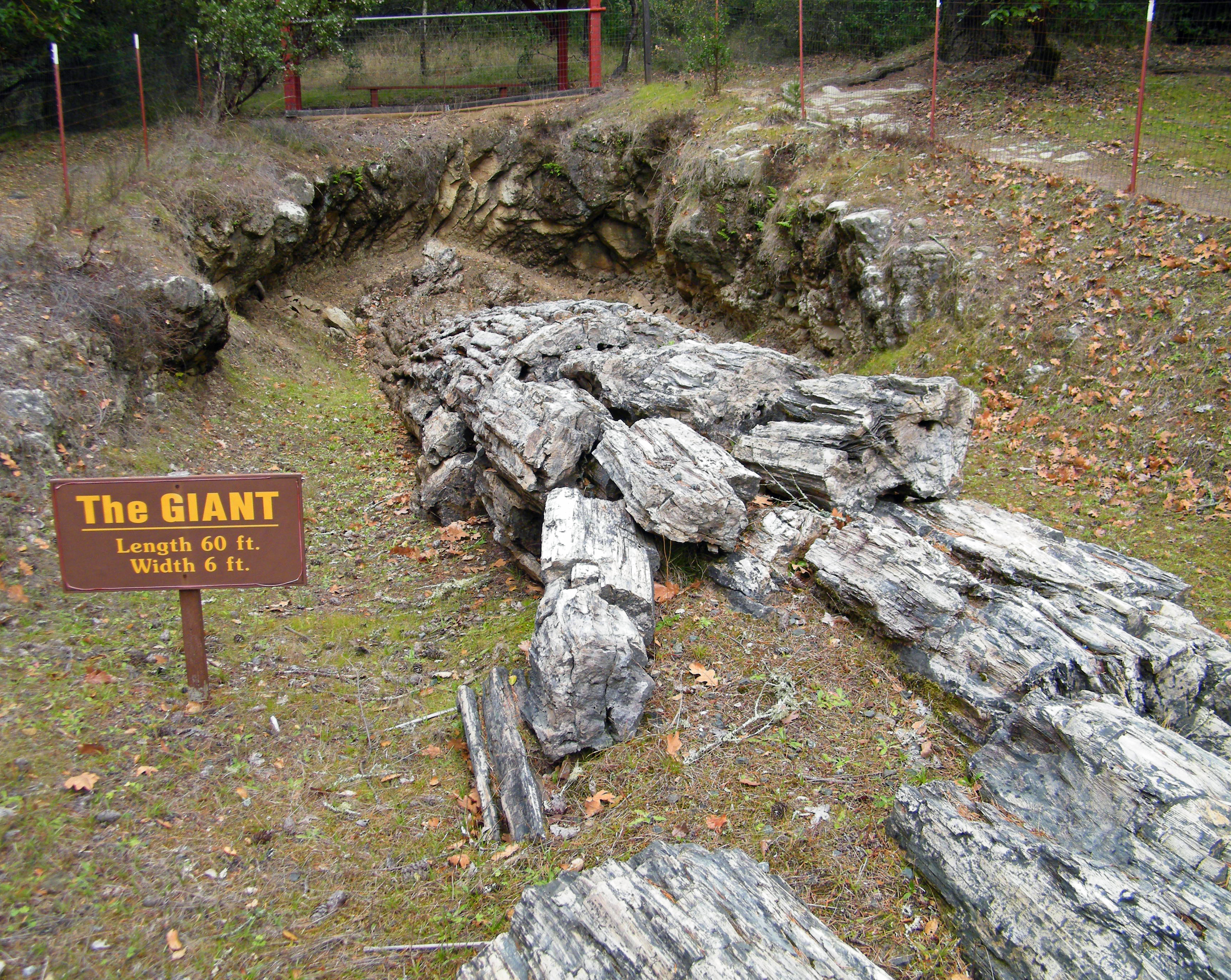
- "The Giant" at the Petrified Forest
- Interactive map of Petrified Forest
- Location: Sonoma County, California, United States
- Nearest city: Calistoga, California
- Coordinates: 38°33′23″N 122°38′22″W
- Area: 845 acres (342 ha)
- Open: Year round
- Status: Open

Petrified Forest
- Interactive map of Petrified Forest

California Historical Landmark
- Official name: Petrified Forest
- Designated: January 31, 1978
- Reference no.: 915

The Petrified Forest is a petrified forest located in Sonoma County, California, in the United States. It is the only petrified forest in California from the Pliocene. It also has the largest petrified trees in the world.

== History ==
=== Geological history ===
Approximately 3.4 million years ago, a volcano eruption at Mount St. Helena caused the trees to become petrified in a process that took thousands of years to complete. Diane Erwin, from the University of California, Berkeley, stated in 2012 that the petrified forest shows that redwood trees were once located further inland, unlike their contemporary descendants that are primarily coastal. The Palynological Society calls the forest "one of the finest examples in the world of an ancient forest."

=== 19th century ===
The forest was discovered in 1870 by Othniel Charles Marsh, who determined that the petrified trees were Sequoia langsdorfii from the Sequoia genus. There is also one petrified pine tree in the forest. Robert Louis Stevenson mentioned the forest in his book The Silverado Squatters (1883).

=== 20th century ===
Since the early 20th century, the same Calistoga-based family has maintained and operated the forest. The forest was bought by Ollie Orre Bockee, from M.C. Meeker, around 1912, for a total cost of $14,000. Bockee continued to purchase surrounding land and acquired a total of 845 acres (342 ha). Bockee opened the property to tourists around 1914 and charged 50 cents per person (equivalent to $17 in 2025). When Bockee died in 1950, her sister became the owner of the property, and Bockee's direct descendants maintain it today. It was listed on the California Historical Landmarks list on January 31, 1978.

=== 21st century ===
In 2012, the family started to send fossilized pollen samples to the University of California, Berkeley for research.

Many of the petrified trees in the forest have nicknames, including "The Queen", which is 8 feet wide and 65 feet long. The Queen was 2,000 years old when the volcano erupted. Additional trees include "The Pit Tree" and "The Giant". There are a cluster of trees named after Ollie Orre Bockee and a tree named after Robert Louis Stevenson.

The forest is again open to the public to visit after restoration from damage caused by the Napa and Sonoma fires of 2017.

As of 2023 the property has been up for sale, with an asking price of $12 million.
