= Mount Saint Helena =

Mountain in California, United States

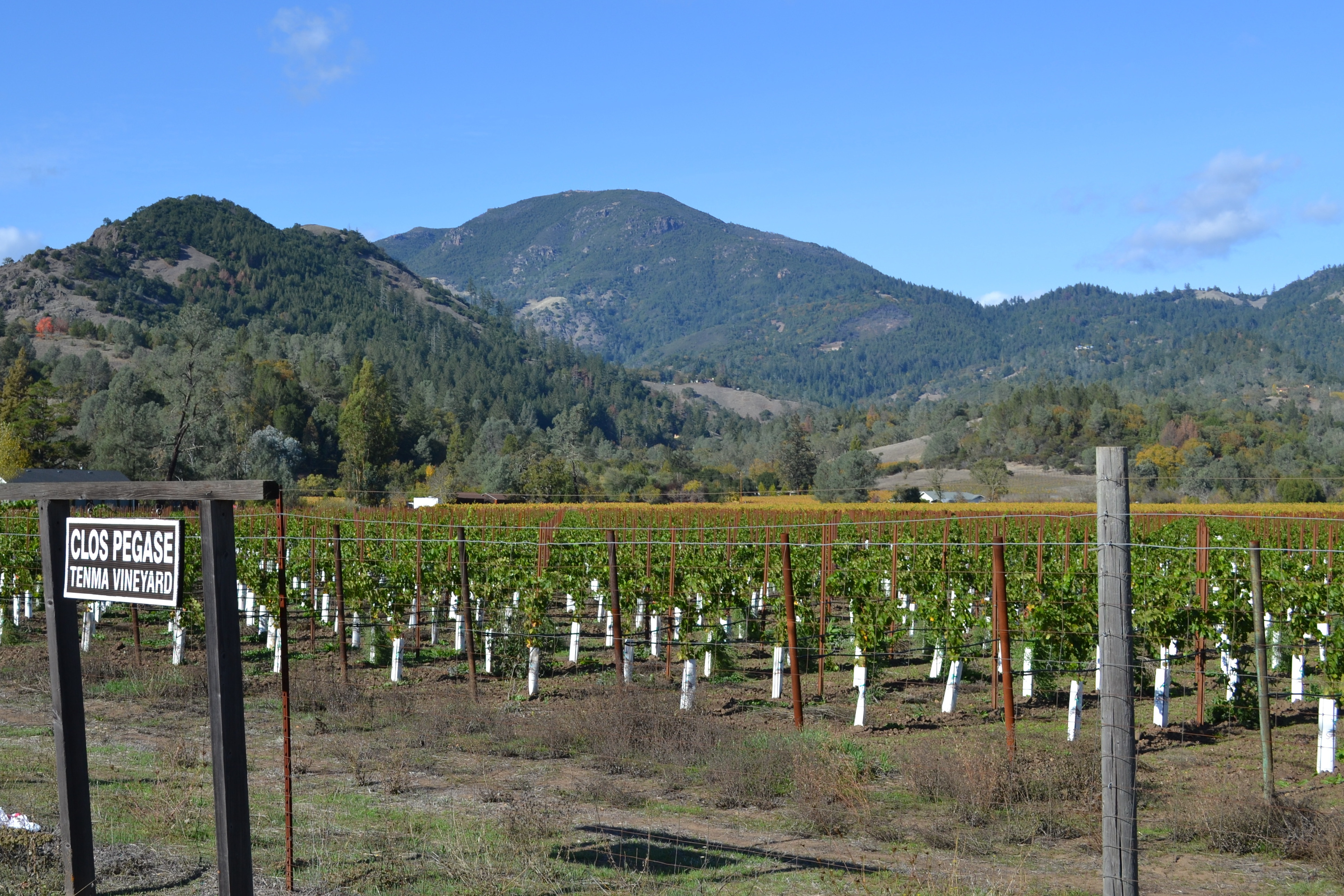
- Mount Saint Helena, viewed from northern Napa Valley

Highest point
- Elevation: 4,342 ft (1,323 m) NAVD 88
- Prominence: 1,823 ft (556 m)
- Listing: California county high points 44th
- Coordinates: 38°40′10″N 122°38′01″W

Geography
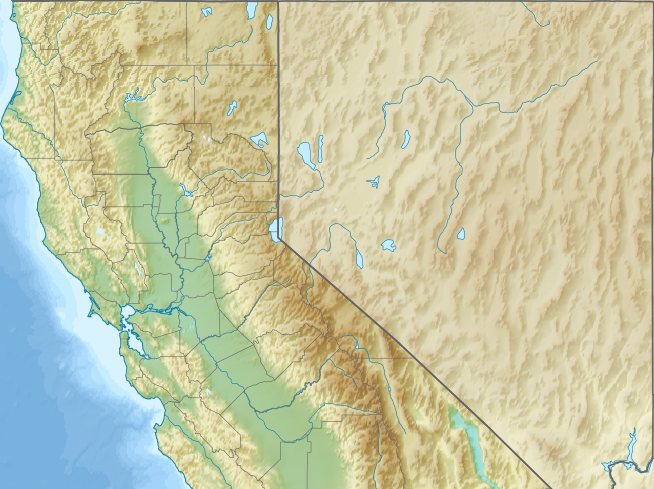
- Location within Northern California
- Location: Sonoma County, California, U.S.
- Parent range: Mayacamas Mountains
- Topo map: USGS Mount Saint Helena

Climbing
- First ascent: 1841
- Easiest route: Hiking trail

Mount Saint Helena (Wappo: Kanamota, "Human Mountain") is a peak in the Mayacamas Mountains with flanks in Napa, Sonoma, and Lake counties of California. Composed of uplifted volcanic rocks from the Clear Lake Volcanic Field, it is one of the few mountains in the San Francisco Bay Area to receive any snowfall during the winter.

The mountain has five peaks, arranged in a rough "M" shape. Its highest point, North Peak, is in Sonoma County. The second-tallest, immediately east of the main summit, is the highest point in Napa County. The headwaters of the Napa River arise on the southeast slope of Mount Saint Helena.

== History ==
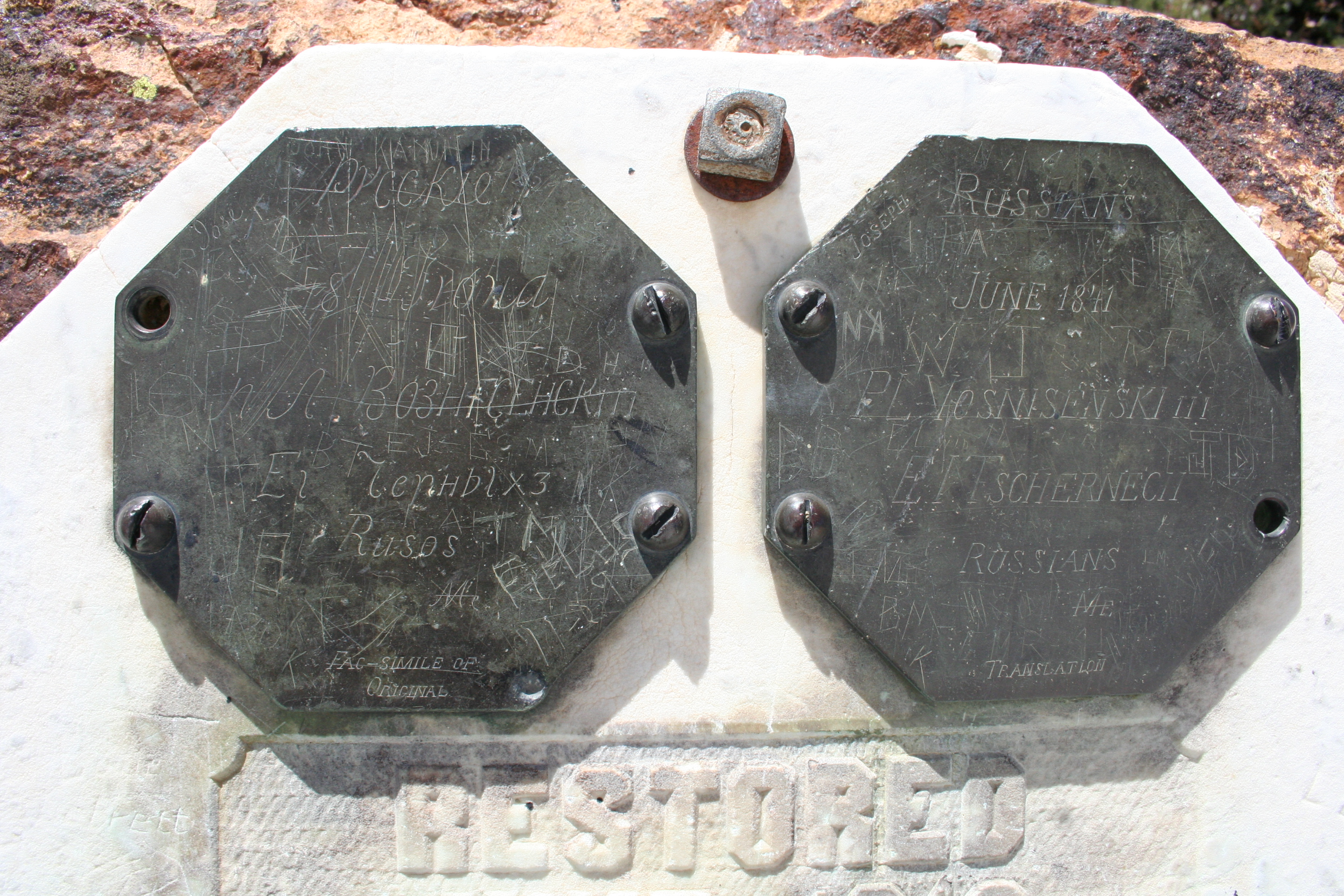
Replicas of a plaque left by Russians on Mount Saint Helena

Mount Saint Helena has had an explosive history of pyroclastic flows that resulted in California's Petrified Forest.

Mount Saint Helena, originally named Kanamota ("Human Mountain") by the Wappo, and later Mount Mayacamas by Spanish colonists, was renamed by a Russian survey party who ascended the peak in 1841. They left a copper plate on the summit inscribed with the date of their visit and the name of Princess Helena de Gagarin, wife of Alexander G. Rotchev, the commanding officer of Fort Ross.

The peak is accessible by hiking trails leading from Robert Louis Stevenson State Park. The trails are approximately 6 miles (9.7 km) long.

Scottish writer Robert Louis Stevenson and his wife Fanny Vandegrift Osbourne spent the summer of 1880 honeymooning in an abandoned mining camp on Mount Saint Helena. Stevenson's book The Silverado Squatters describes his experiences while living there. A state park was named after him near here.

=== Representation in other media ===
The mount is described by Ambrose Bierce in his ghost story The Death of Halpin Frayser. Ursula K. Le Guin's novel Always Coming Home is about a post-apocalyptic society that considers Mount Saint Helena sacred.

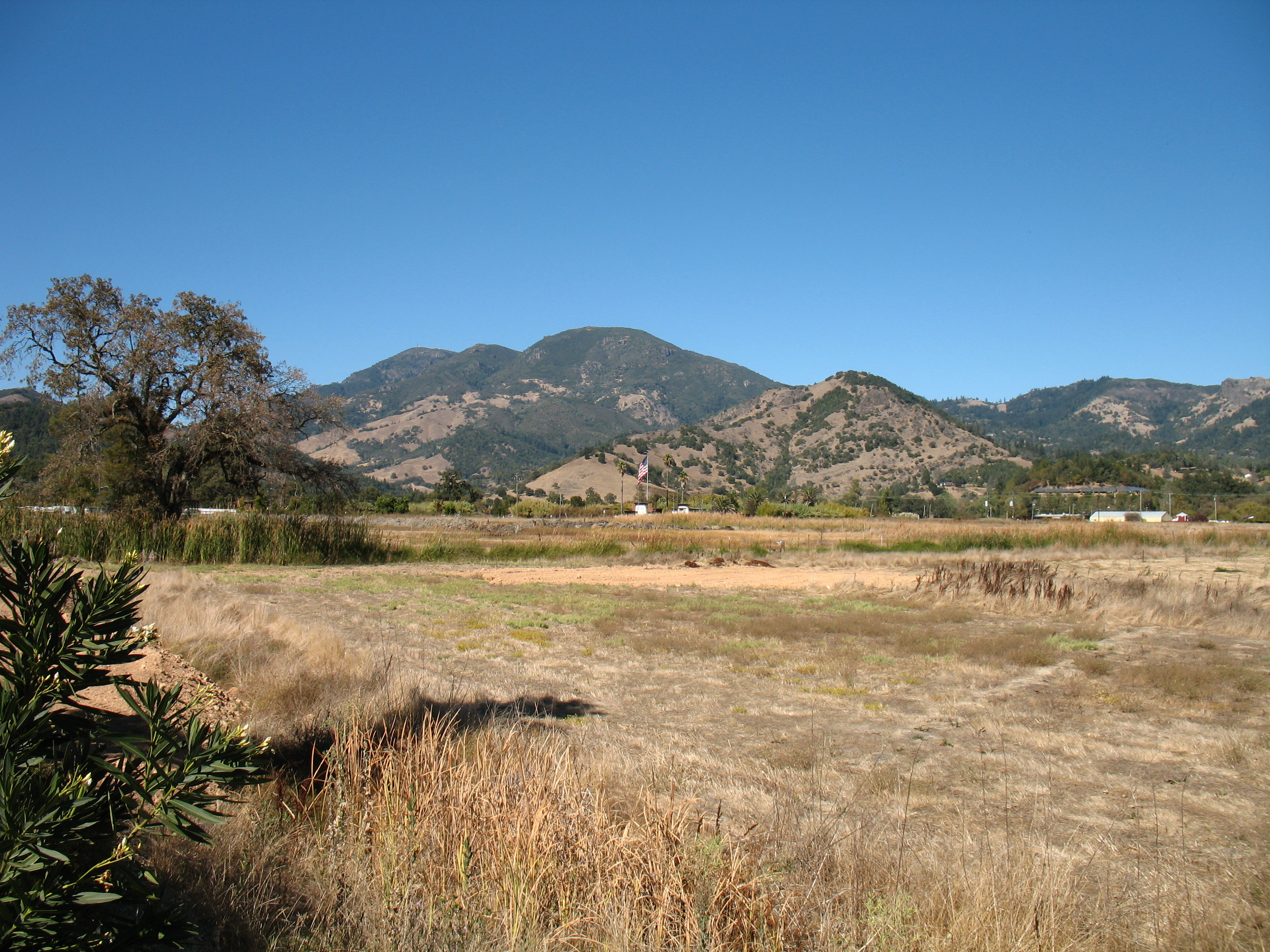
Mount Saint Helena

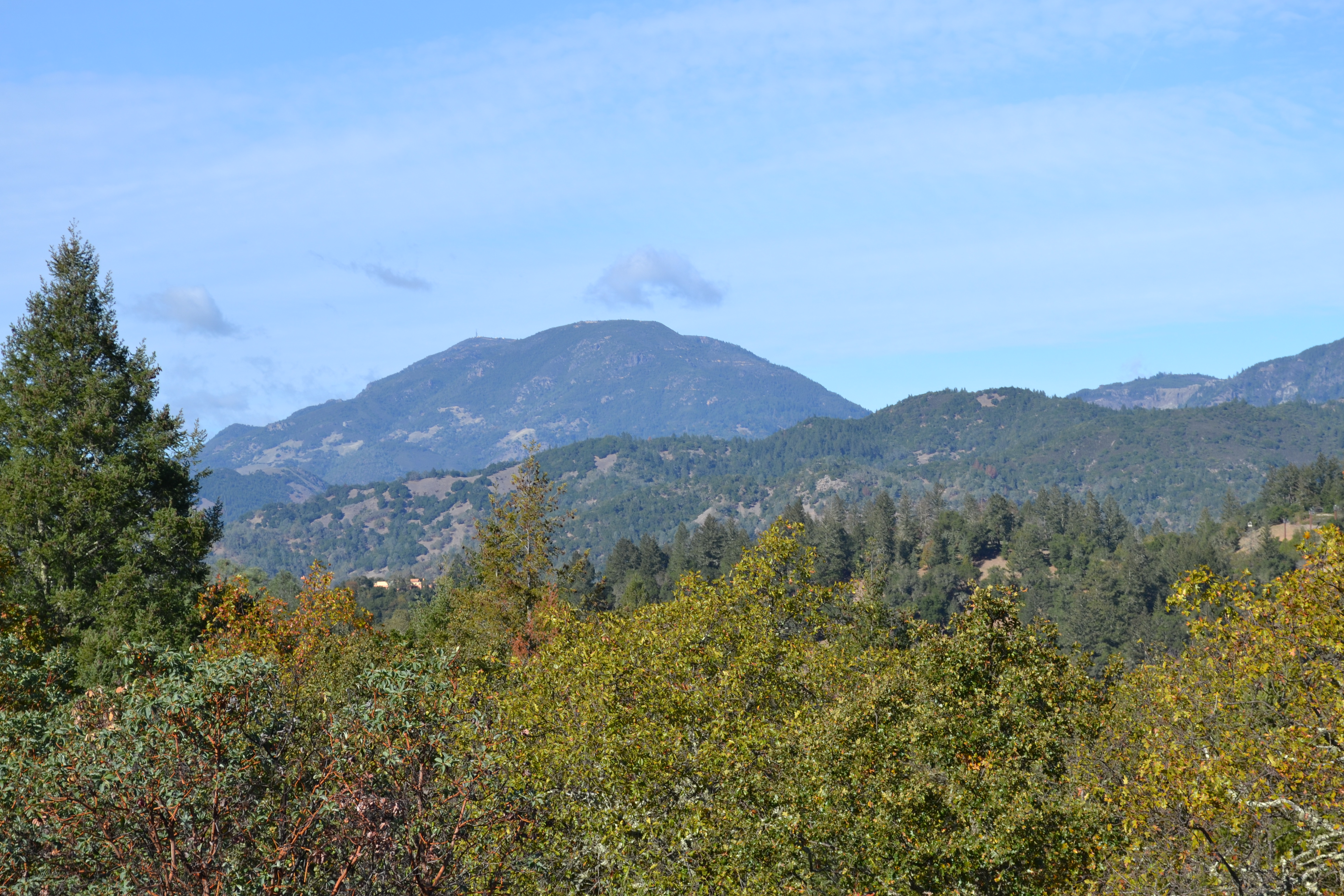
Another view of the mountain

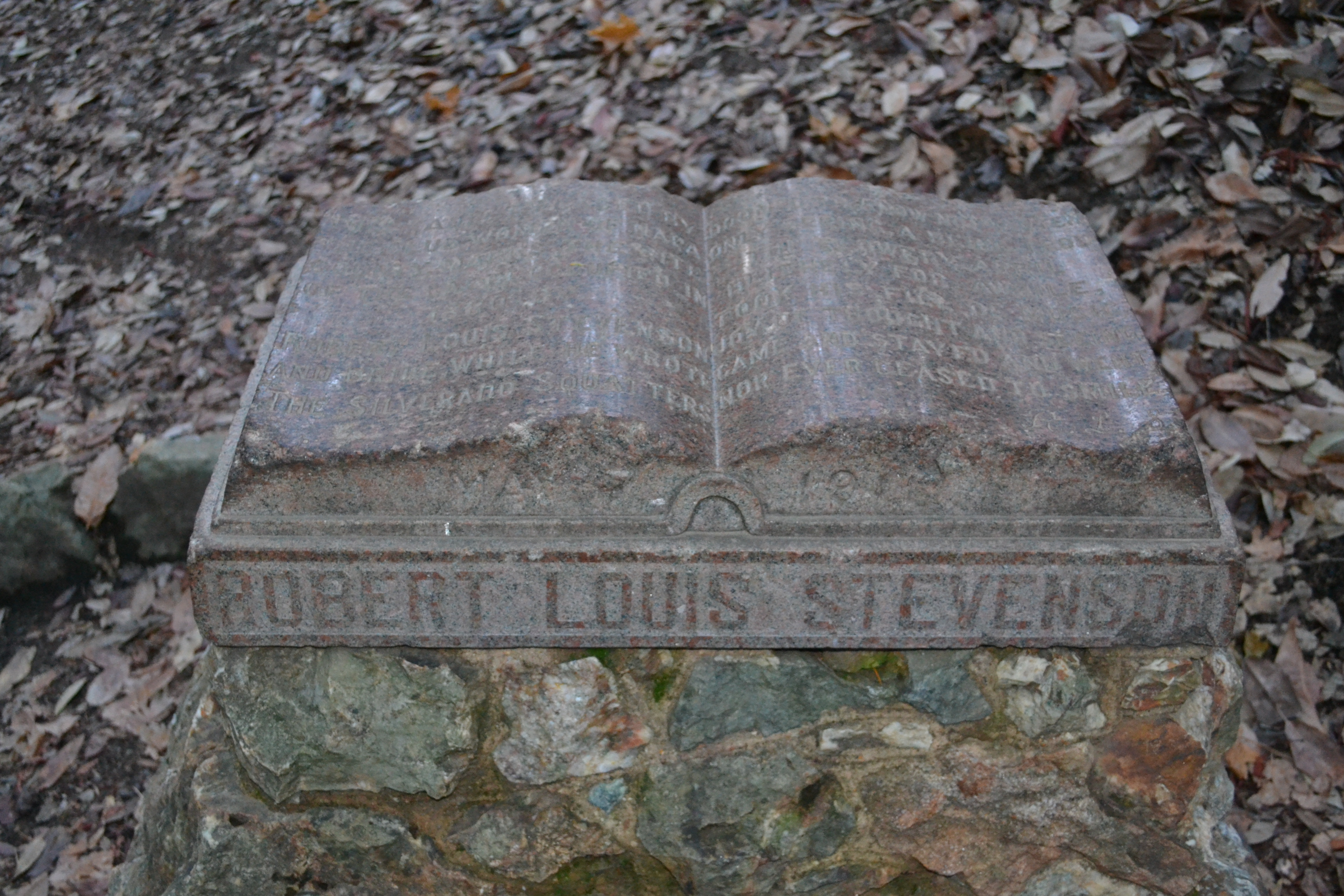
Robert Louis Stevenson monument in Robert Louis Stevenson State Park

== Views from the summit ==
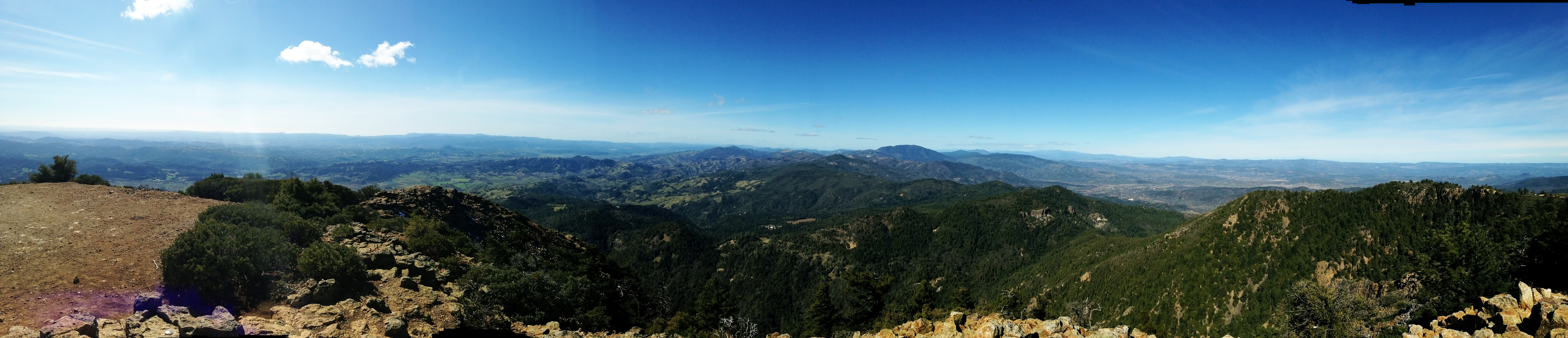
Panorama from top of Mount Saint Helena
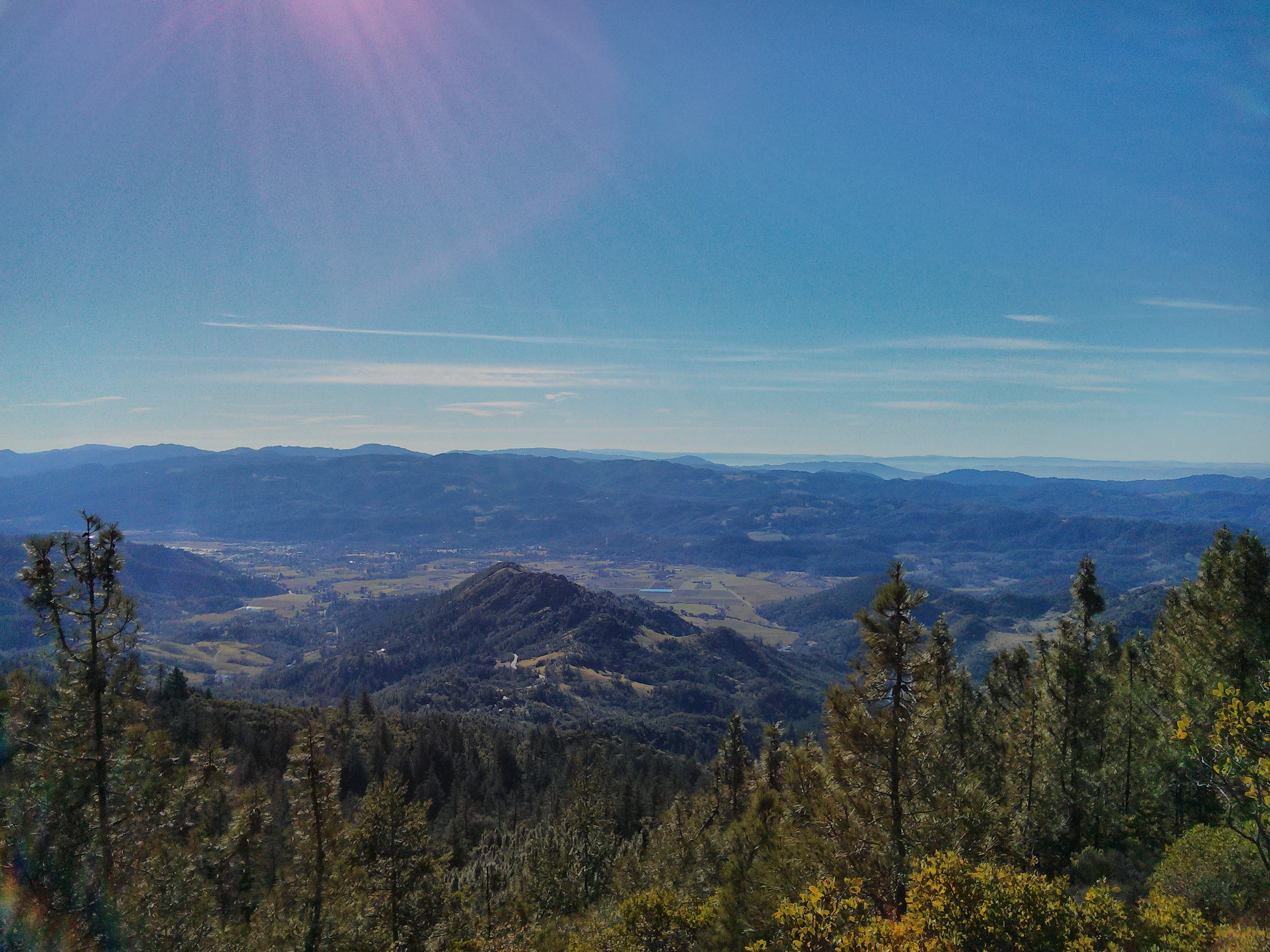
Calistoga viewed from Mount Saint Helena

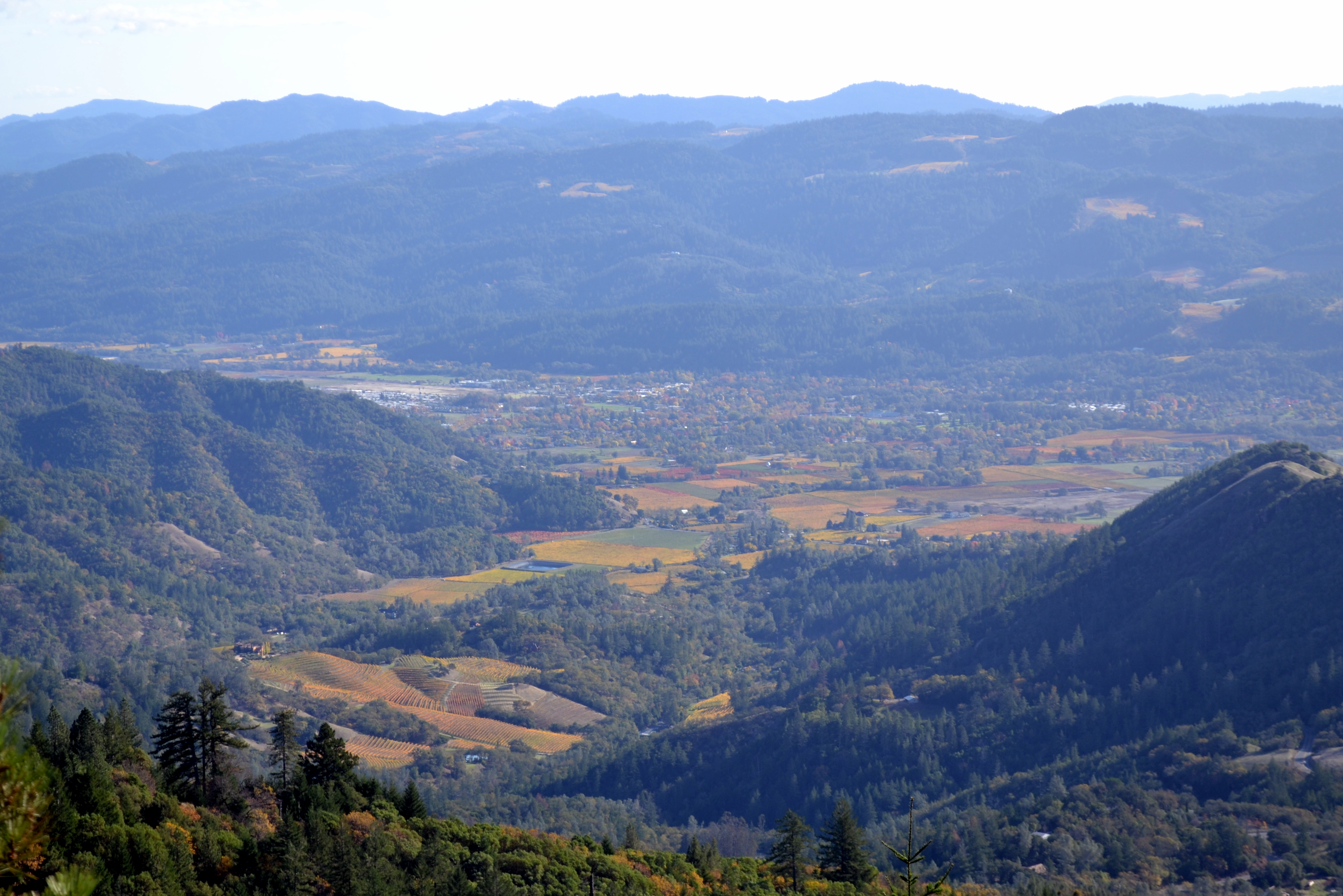
Northern Napa Valley viewed from Mount Saint Helena

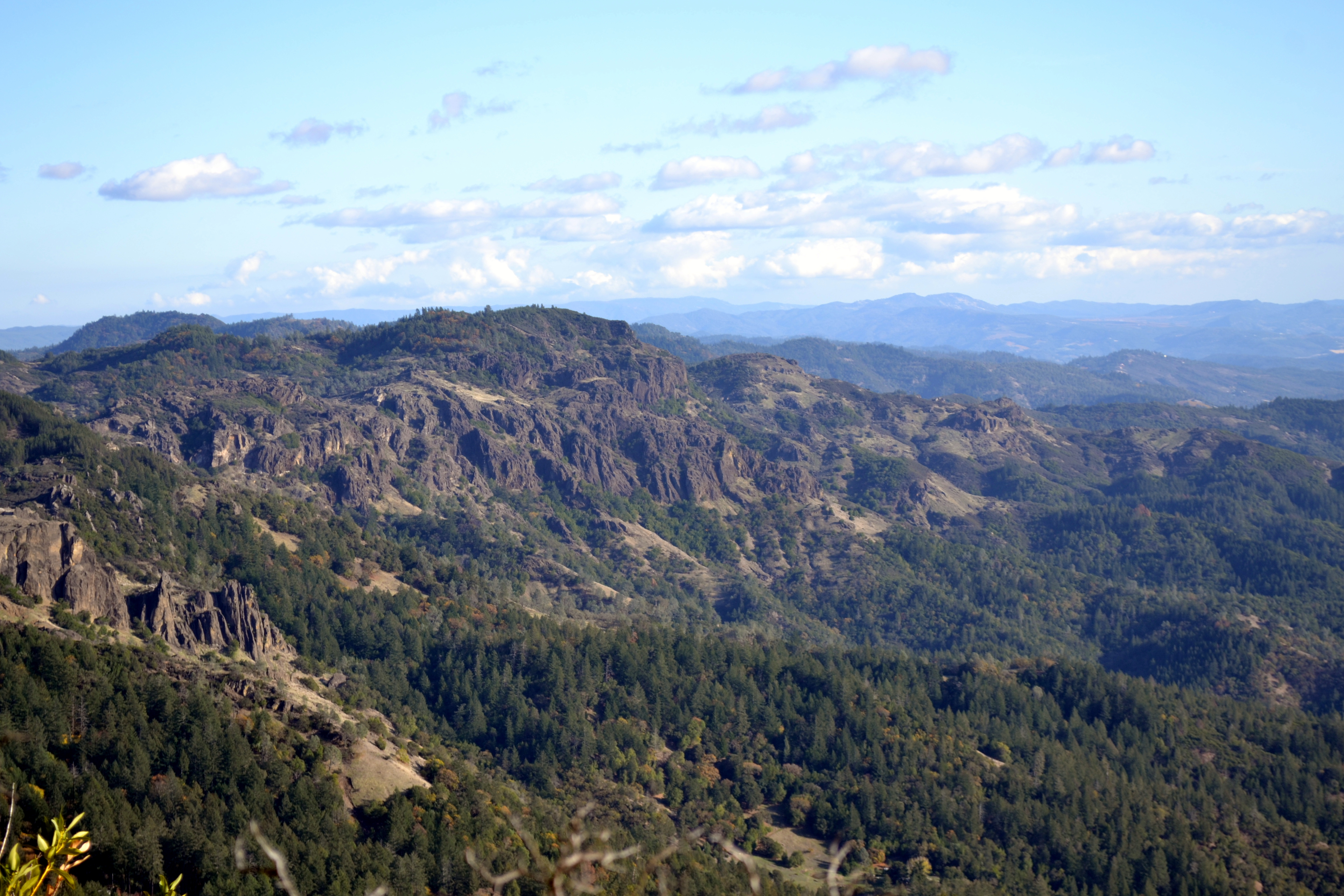
A view from the mountain

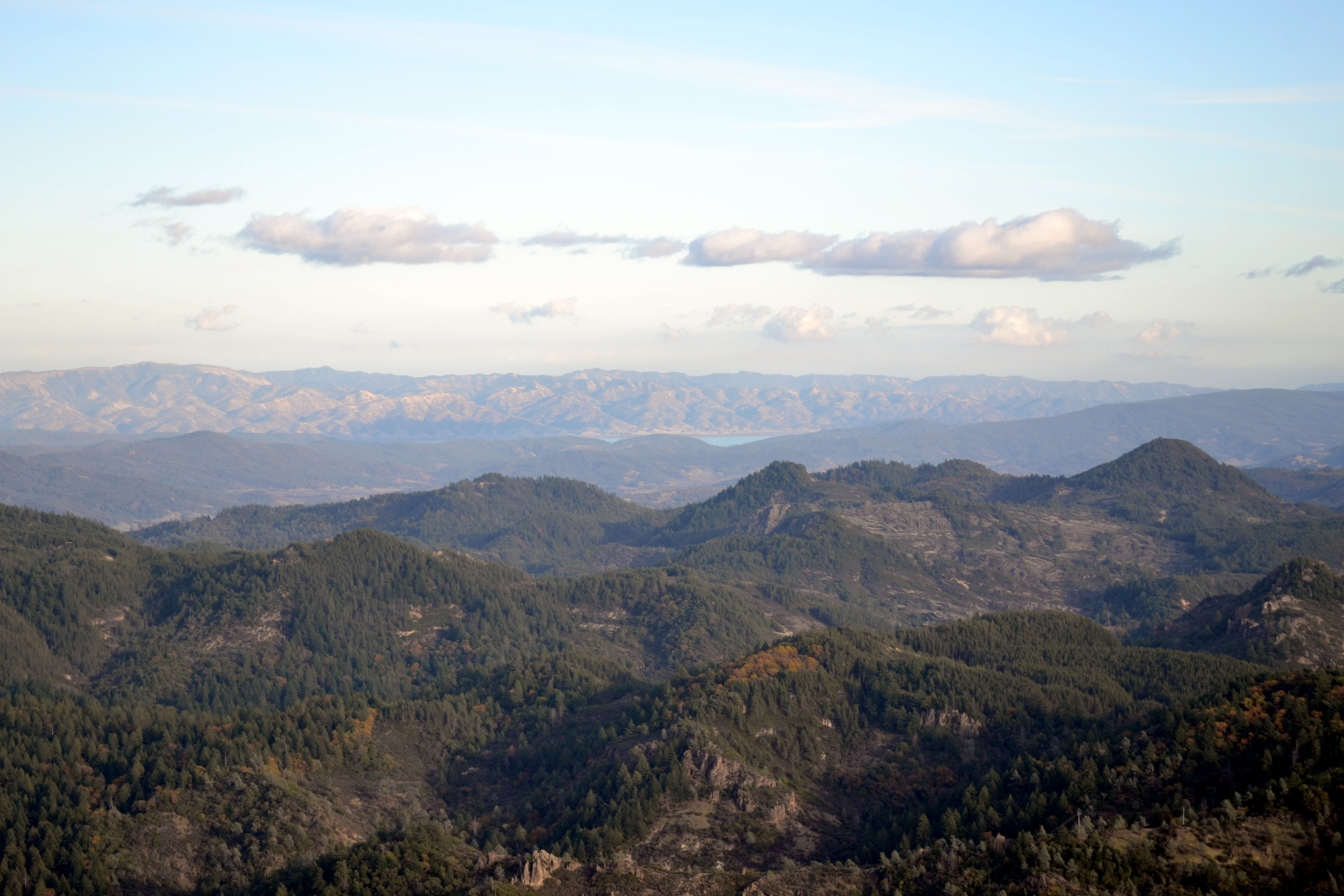
Another view

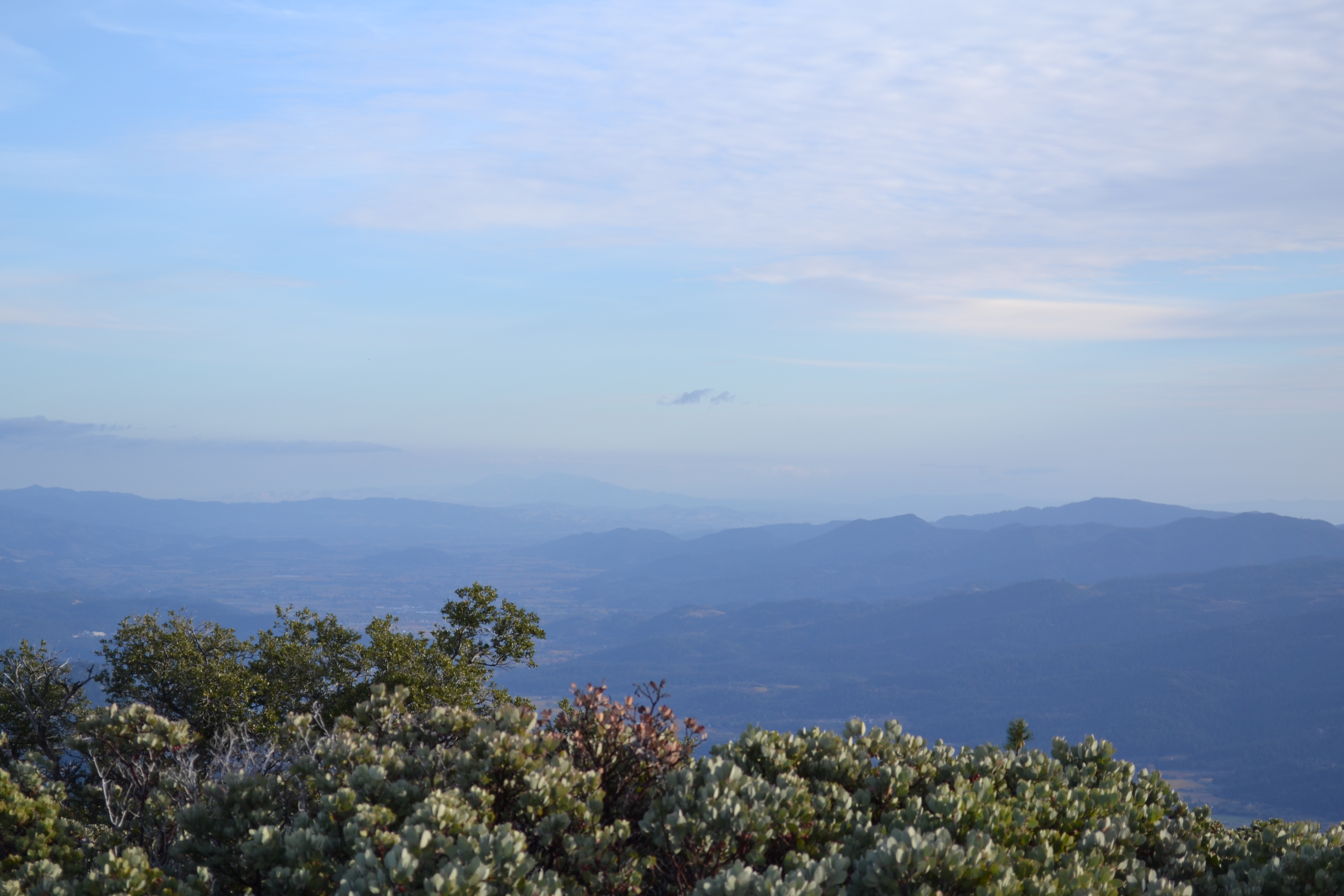
Another view

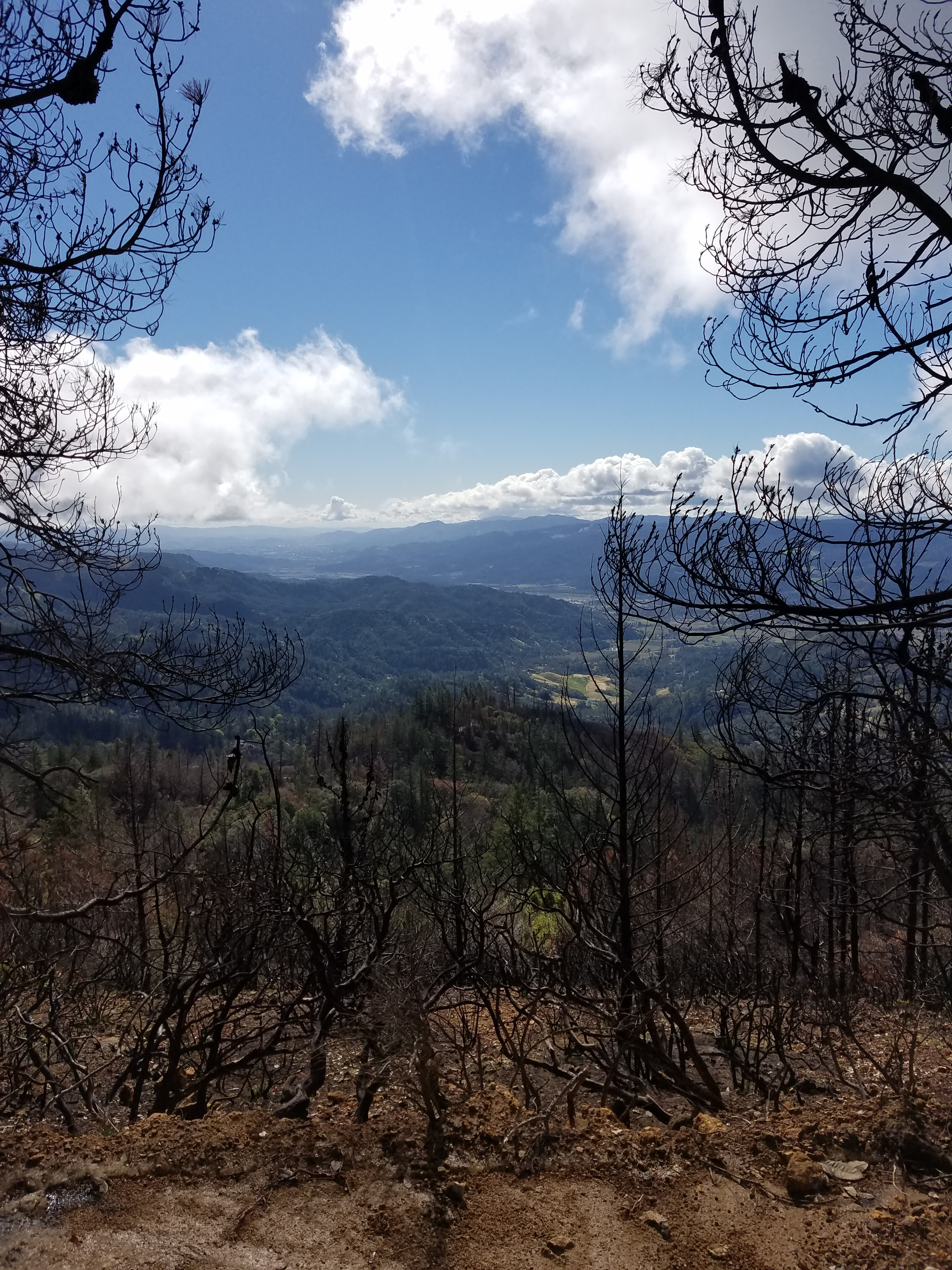
View after 2017 fire

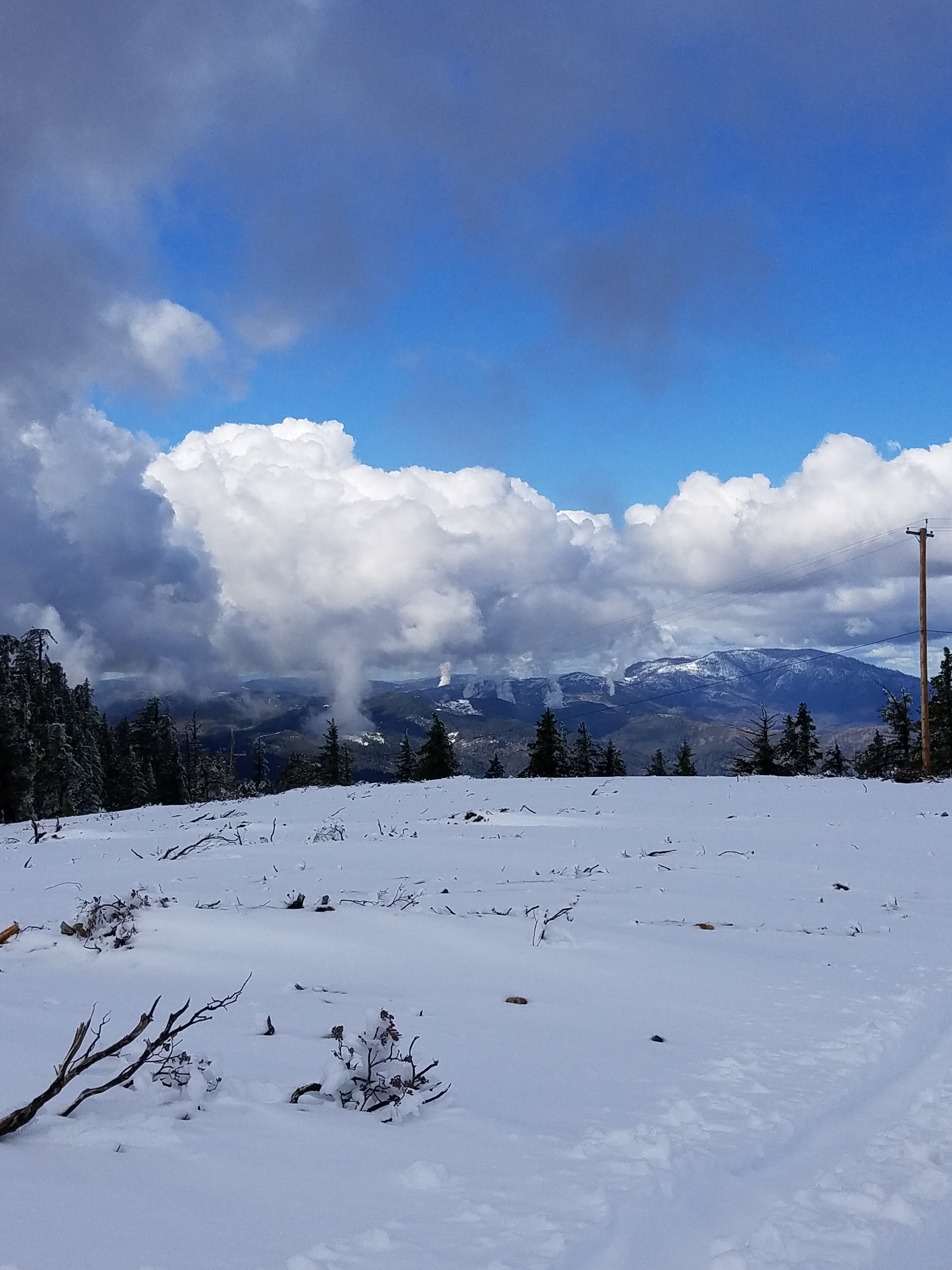
Snow view

== See also ==
- List of summits of the San Francisco Bay Area
