= Robert Louis Stevenson State Park =

State park in California, United States

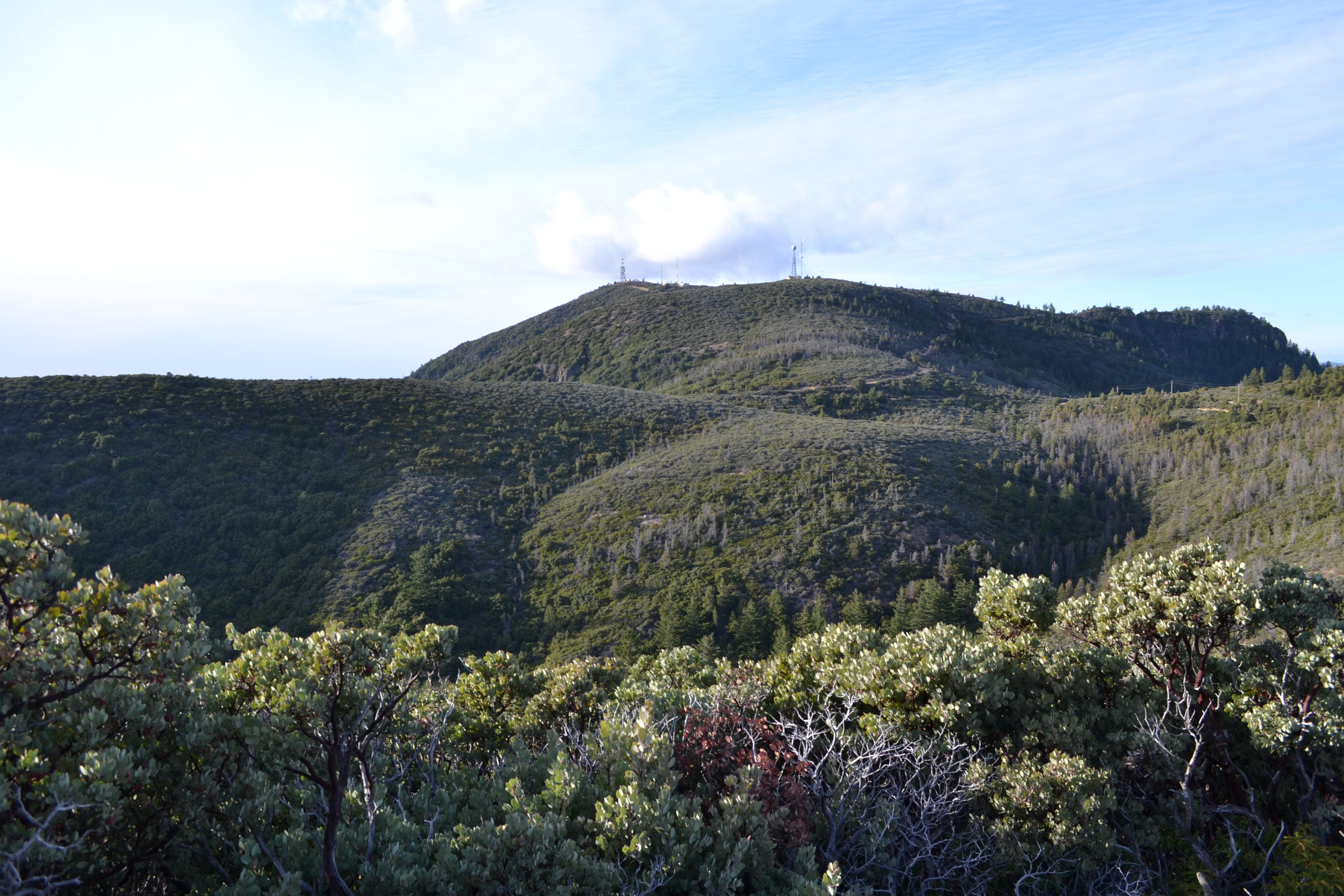
- One of the peaks of Mount Saint Helena

- Location within California Location within the United States
- Location: Sonoma and Napa counties, California
- Nearest city: Calistoga, California
- Coordinates: 38°39′12″N 122°36′12″W
- Governing body: State of California

California Historical Landmark
- Reference no.: 710

Robert Louis Stevenson State Park is a California state park, located in Sonoma, Lake and Napa counties. The park offers a 5-mile (8 km) hike to the summit of Mount Saint Helena from which much of the Bay Area can be seen. On clear days it is possible to see the peak of Mount Shasta, 192 miles (310 km) distant.

== Overview ==
The park is named after Robert Louis Stevenson, the Scottish author of Treasure Island and Kidnapped. In 1880, Stevenson and his new wife Fanny Vandegrift Osbourne spent their honeymoon living in a cabin at a played-out mine on the mountain along with Fanny's son Lloyd Osbourne. Although nothing remains of the cabin, the site is identified on the trail to the summit. Stevenson's book Silverado Squatters contains stories he wrote about his experiences during his visit to the area.

The area has rough terrain, with evergreen forests in the canyons on north-facing slopes and chaparral on the south-facing slopes.

Robert Louis Stevenson State Park is located off State Route 29 between Calistoga and Middletown. The park is registered as California Historical Landmark #710.

== 2017 fire and temporary closure ==
As a result of a fire starting on Tubbs Lane in Calistoga, the park was temporarily closed on October 10, 2017.

== Gallery ==
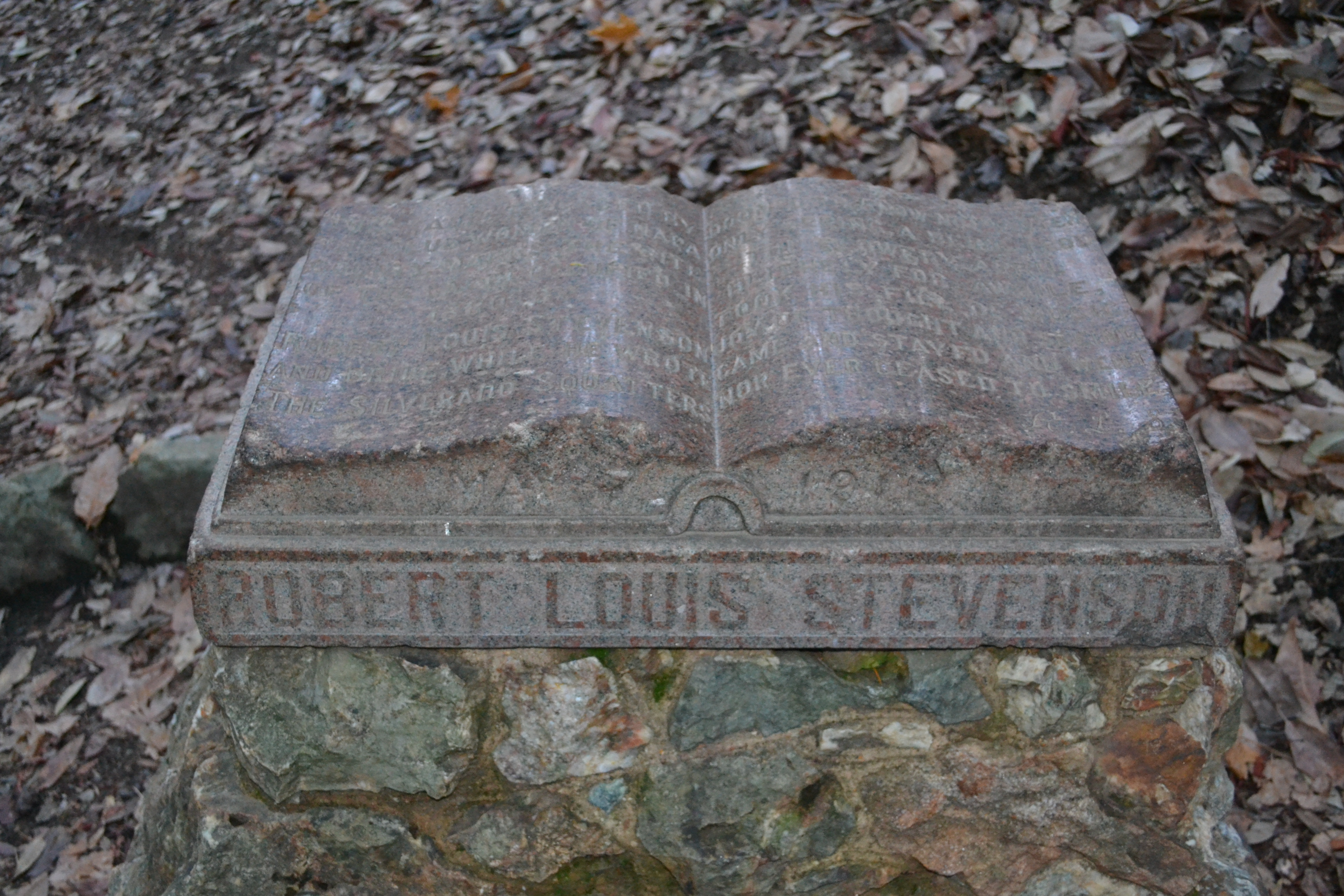
Robert Louis Stevenson monument in the park

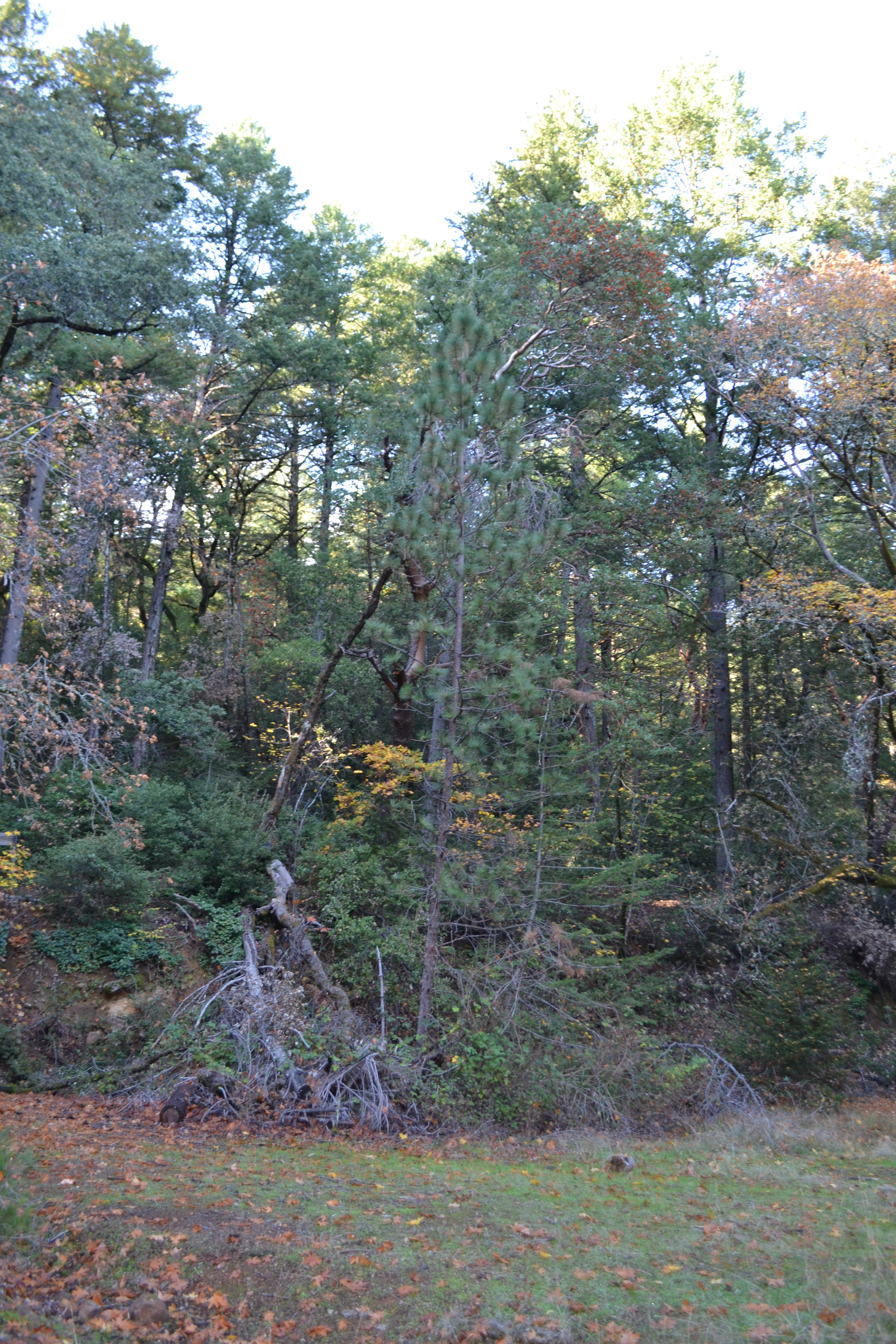
The lower reaches of the park

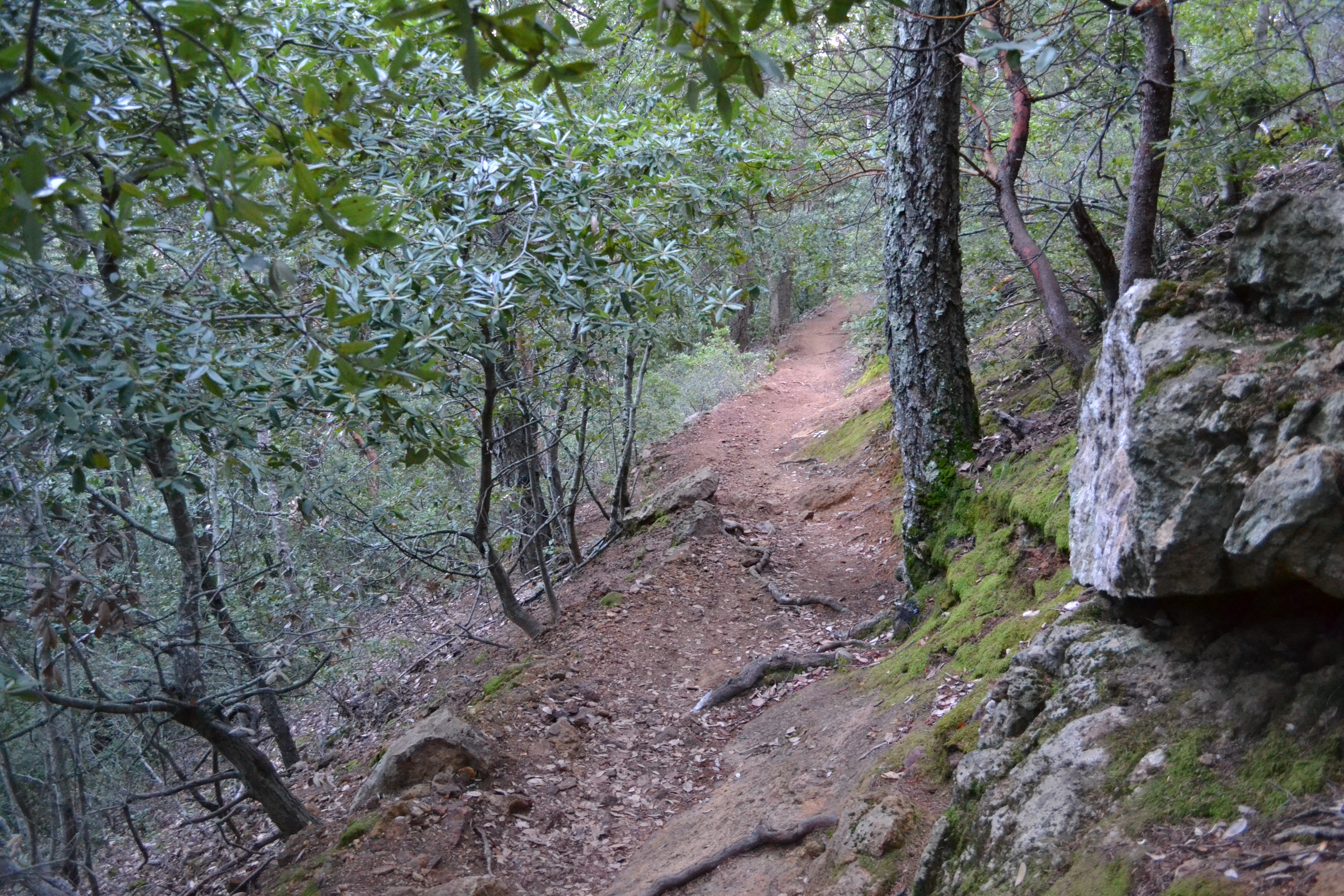
Trail in the park towards the summit of Mount Saint Helena

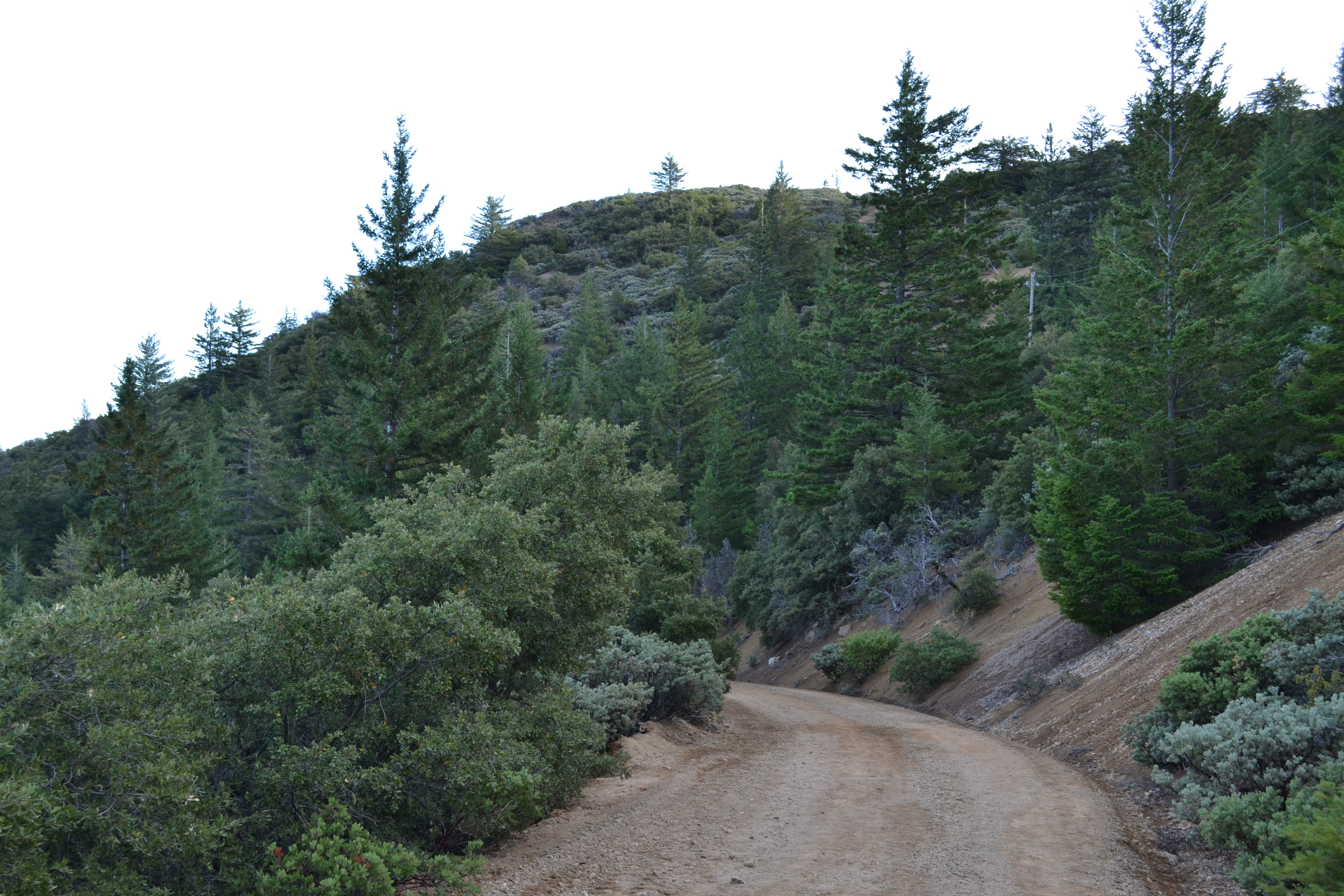
Farther up on the trail

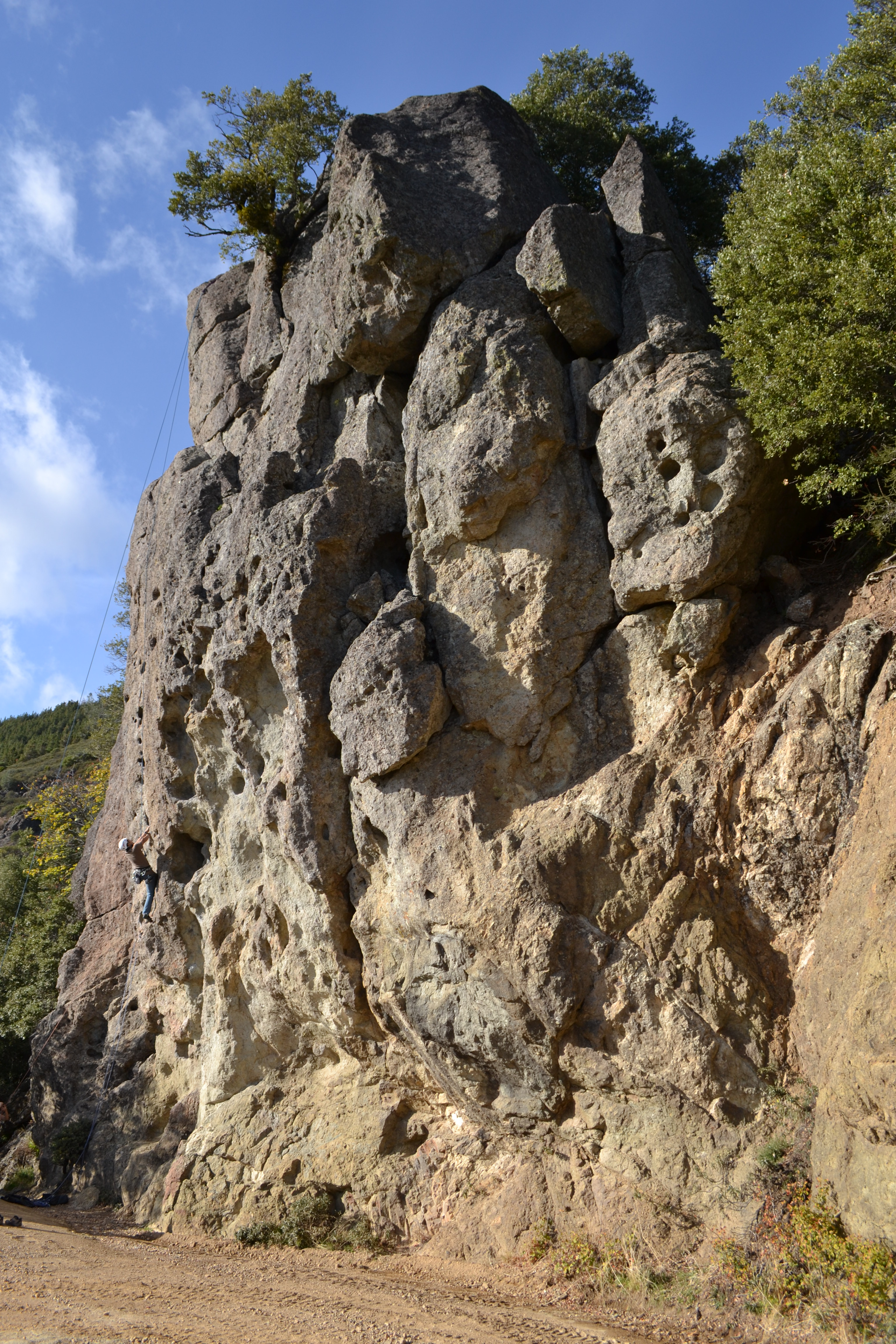
Rock formation in the park

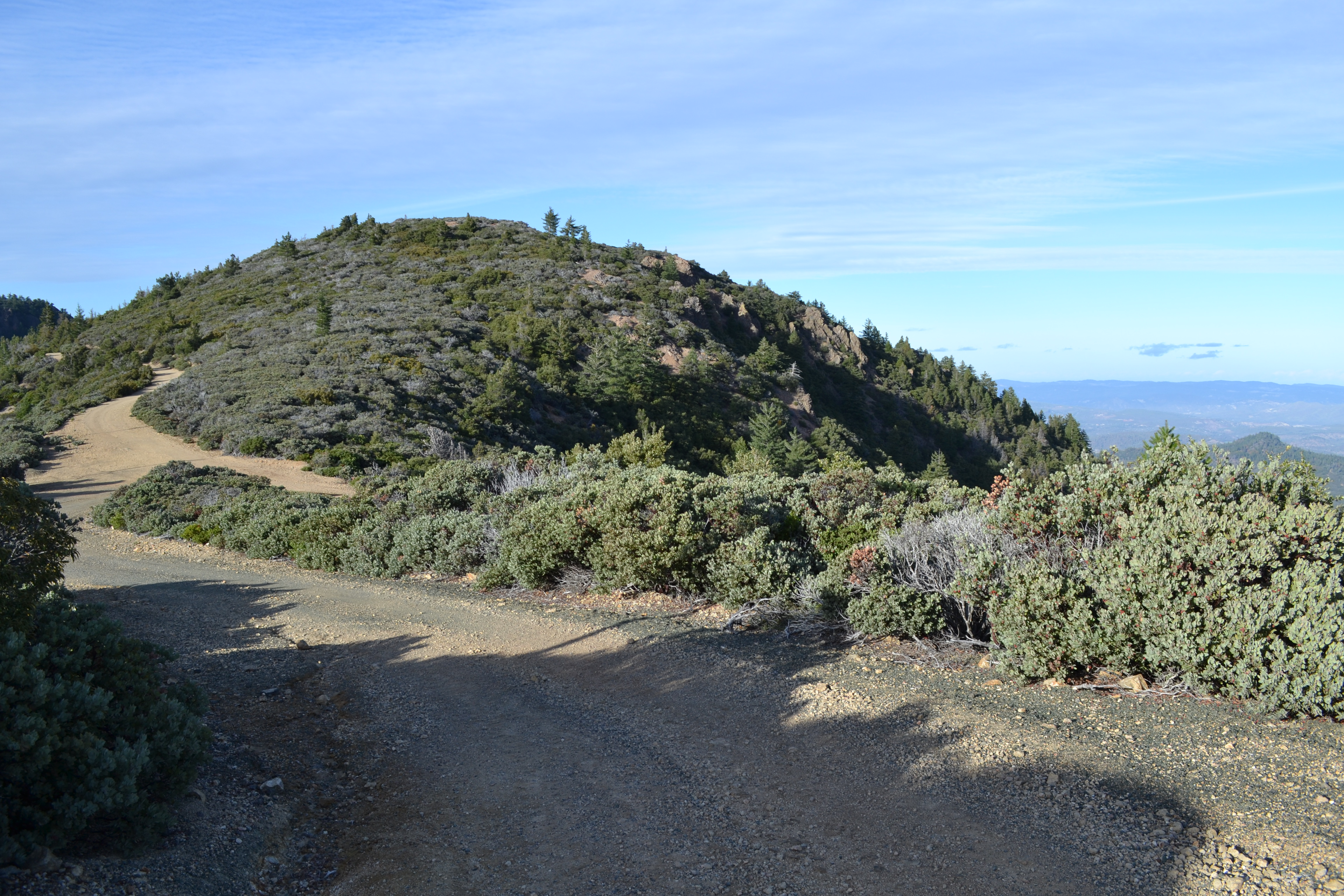
Farther up on the trail

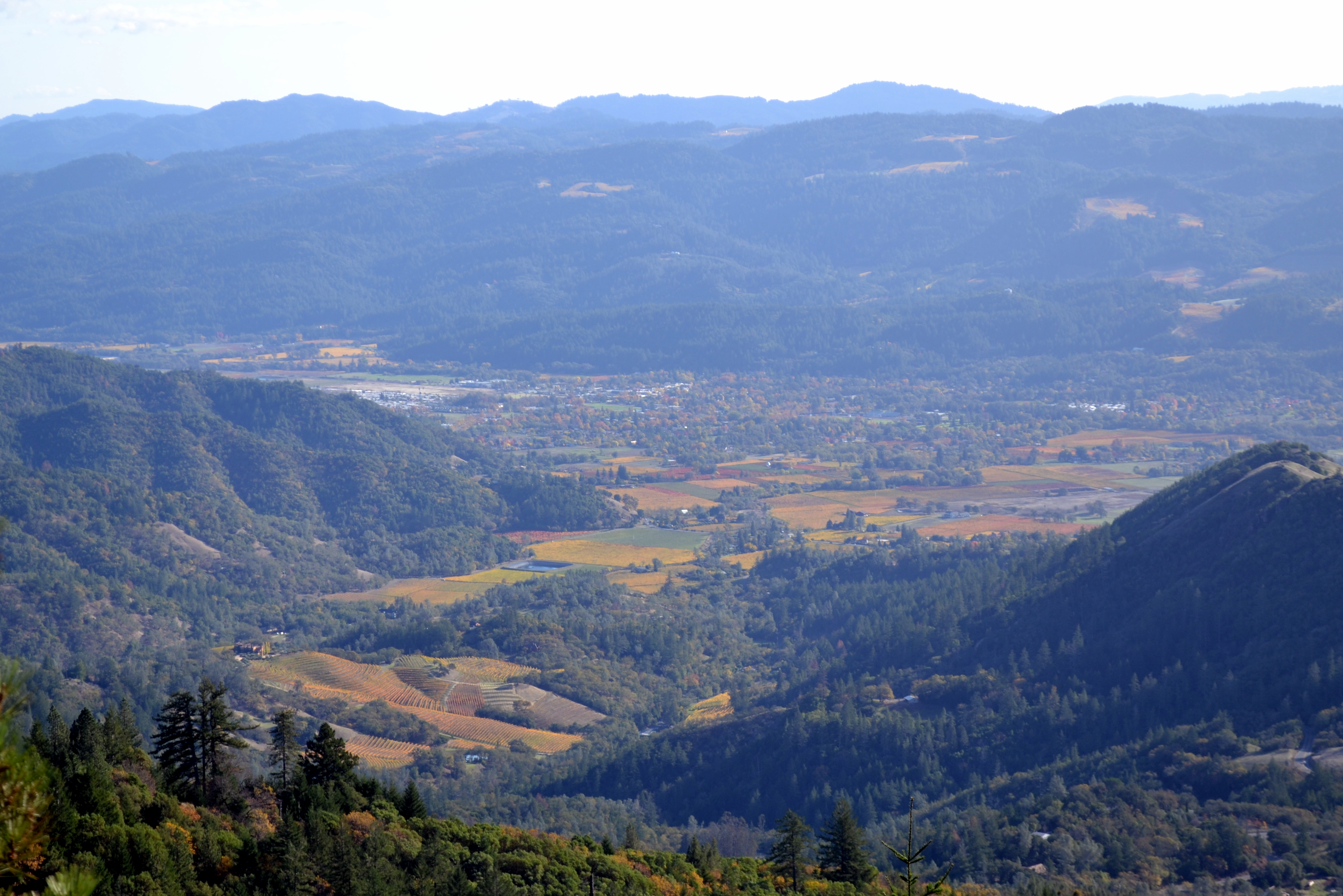
Northern Napa Valley viewed from Mount Saint Helena
