= The Silverado Squatters =

1883 travel memoir by Robert Louis Stevenson

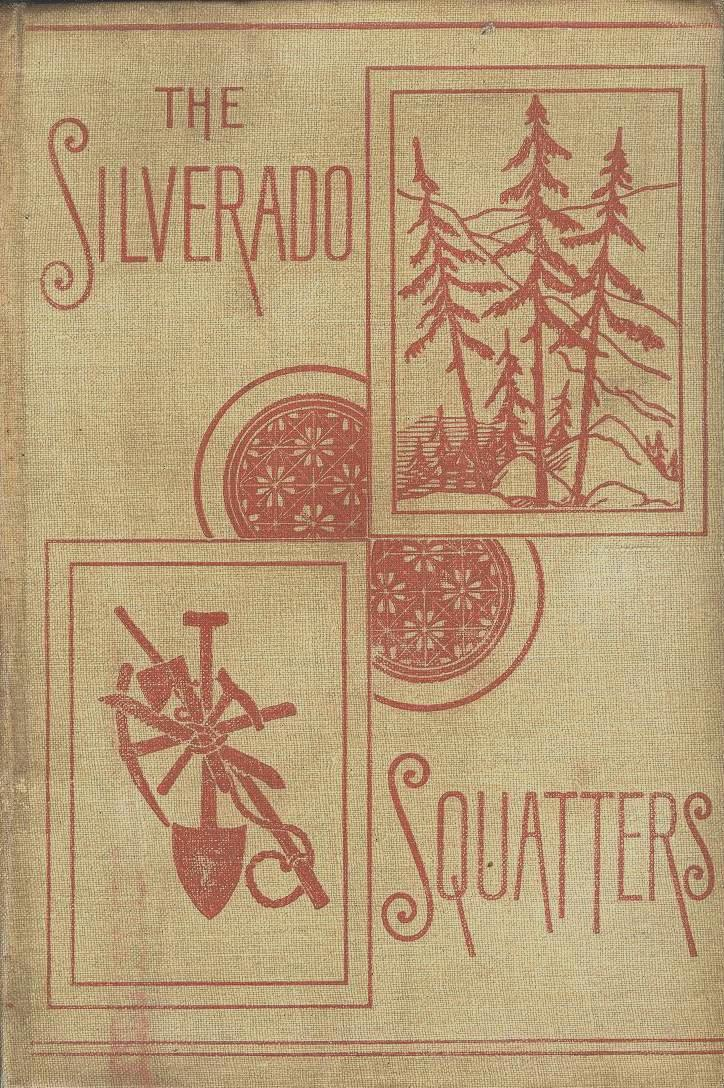
- 2nd U.K. edition 1886
- Author: Robert Louis Stevenson
- Language: English and Scots
- Genre: Short stories
- Publisher: Chatto and Windus
- Publication date: 1883
- Publication place: Scotland
- Media type: Print (Hardback)

The Silverado Squatters (1883) is a travel memoir by Robert Louis Stevenson of his two-month honeymoon trip with Fanny Vandegrift (and her son Lloyd Osbourne) to Napa Valley, California, in 1880.

== Background ==
In July 1879, Stevenson received word that his future American wife's divorce was almost complete, but that she was seriously ill. He left Scotland right away and travelled to meet her in Monterey, California, (his trip detailed in The Amateur Emigrant (1894) and Across the Plains (1892)). Broken financially, suffering from a lifelong fibrinous bronchitis condition, and with his writing career at a dead end, he was nursed back to health by his doctor, his nurse, and his future wife, while living briefly in Monterey, San Francisco, and Oakland. His father having provided money to help, on May 19, 1880, he married the Indianapolis native, whom he had first met in France in 1875, soon after the events of An Inland Voyage. Still too weak to undertake the journey back to Scotland, friends suggested Calistoga, in the upper Napa Valley, with its healthy mountain air.

=== Summary ===
The couple first went to the Hot Springs Hotel in Calistoga, but unable to afford the 10 dollars a week fee, they spent an unconventional honeymoon in an abandoned three-story bunkhouse at a derelict mining camp called "Silverado" on the shoulder of Mount Saint Helena in the Mayacamas Mountains. There they squatted for two months during summer, putting up makeshift cloth windows and hauling water in by hand from a nearby stream while dodging rattlesnakes and the occasional fog banks so detrimental to Stevenson's health.

The Silverado Squatters provides some views of California during the late 19th century. Stevenson uses the first telephone of his life. He meets a number of wine growers in Napa Valley, an enterprise he deems "experimental", with growers sometimes even mislabeling the bottles as originating from Spain in order to sell their product to skeptical Americans. He visits the oldest wine grower in the valley, Jacob Schram, who had been experimenting for 18 years at his Schramsberg Winery, and had recently expanded the wine cellar in his backyard. Stevenson also visits a petrified forest owned by an old Swedish ex-sailor who had stumbled upon it while clearing farmland—the precise nature of the petrified forest remained for everyone a source of curiosity. Stevenson also details his encounters with a local Jewish merchant, whom he compares to a character in a Charles Dickens novel (probably Fagin from Oliver Twist), and portrays as happy-go-lucky but always scheming to earn a dollar. Like Dickens in American Notes (1842), Stevenson found the American habit of spitting on the floor hard to get used to.

His experiences at Silverado were recorded in a journal he called "Silverado Sketches", parts of which he incorporated into Silverado Squatters in 1883 while living in Bournemouth, England, with other tales appearing in "Essays of Travel" and "Across the Plains". Many of his notes on the scenery around him later provided much of the descriptive detail for Treasure Island (1883).

== Legacy ==
The Robert Louis Stevenson State Park now encompasses the area where the Stevensons stayed. The entrance to the park is at the summit of State Route 29. A new trail has been constructed in recent years. The Robert Louis Stevenson Museum in St. Helena, California, is dedicated to Stevenson.

== Resources and editions ==
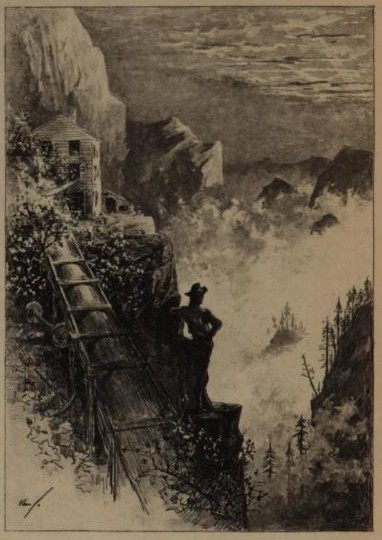

Editions

- An omnibus collection of Stevenson's travel writings, including The Silverado Squatters at Standard Ebooks
- The Silverado Squatters at Project Gutenberg
- The Silverado Squatters, audiobook, Blue Pylon Creative (2005). ISBN 0-9765765-0-3
- The Silverado Squatters, reprint, Tauris Parke Paperbacks (2009). ISBN 1-84511-990-8

Resources

- Silverado Museum in St. Helena, California, devoted to Robert Louis Stevenson.
