= Gertrude Bugler =

British stage actress

Gertrude Bugler (1897 – 1992) was a British stage actress of the Edwardian Era best known for acting in plays adapted by Thomas Hardy.

== Biography ==
Gertrude Bugler was born in 1897 in Dorchester, Dorset (the hometown of Thomas Hardy). Gertrude was the daughter of Augusta, a hotelier and confectioner. When previously working as a milkmaid, Augusta had attracted the attention of the young Thomas Hardy, before he became a writer. Hardy was too shy to approach Augusta, but in 1890 he had used her as the model for the heroine in his novel Tess of the d'Urbervilles. Hardy then moved to London to pursue his successful writing career and did not see her again until he returned to Dorchester in 1913. Hardy, then aged 72, had returned to his old home to work on dramatisations of his novels. By this time, Augusta had been married and was running a hotel where Hardy set up house and used it as a headquarters for his theatrical troupe called The Hardy Players, made up of local amateur actors.

=== Early performances ===
Augusta's daughter, Gertrude Bugler, then 16, joined the troupe in 1913, playing Marty South in The Woodlanders. Hardy met her at a rehearsal and later described her, in a letter to Edward Clodd, as "the pretty daughter of a baker here." The play was staged locally. Drama critics who came from London to preview the play gave Bugler glowing reviews for her angelic beauty and her naturalistic style of acting. The Daily News of 20 November 1913 reported that "the performance will probably be remembered by most people as a setting for the debut of Miss Gertrude Bugler" and suggested she might one day play Tess. In 1914, she played the Waiting Maid in The Dynasts. In 1918, she appeared with her parents and sister in The Mellstock Quire, taking the part of schoolmistress Fancy Day.

Returning in 1920, Hardy cast her in the leading role of Eustacia Vye in Return of the Native. The Daily Mirror described her as a "country maid with talents worthy of Bernhardt". The Bournemouth Guardian review quoted others, some – including the Daily Mail – strongly positive, others – including the Daily News – more mixed. The Dorset County Chronicle devoted two columns to its review, reporting that "The 'star' of the company, Miss Gertrude Bugler, naturally and deservedly shone above all others..." and that her voice "conquered the echoes of a very difficult building." In 1921 the Hardy Players performed Return of the Native at the Guildhall School of Music in London. The Times and Directory newspaper noted that Bugler's "acting was extremely good for an amateur performance".

=== 1921 Marriage ===
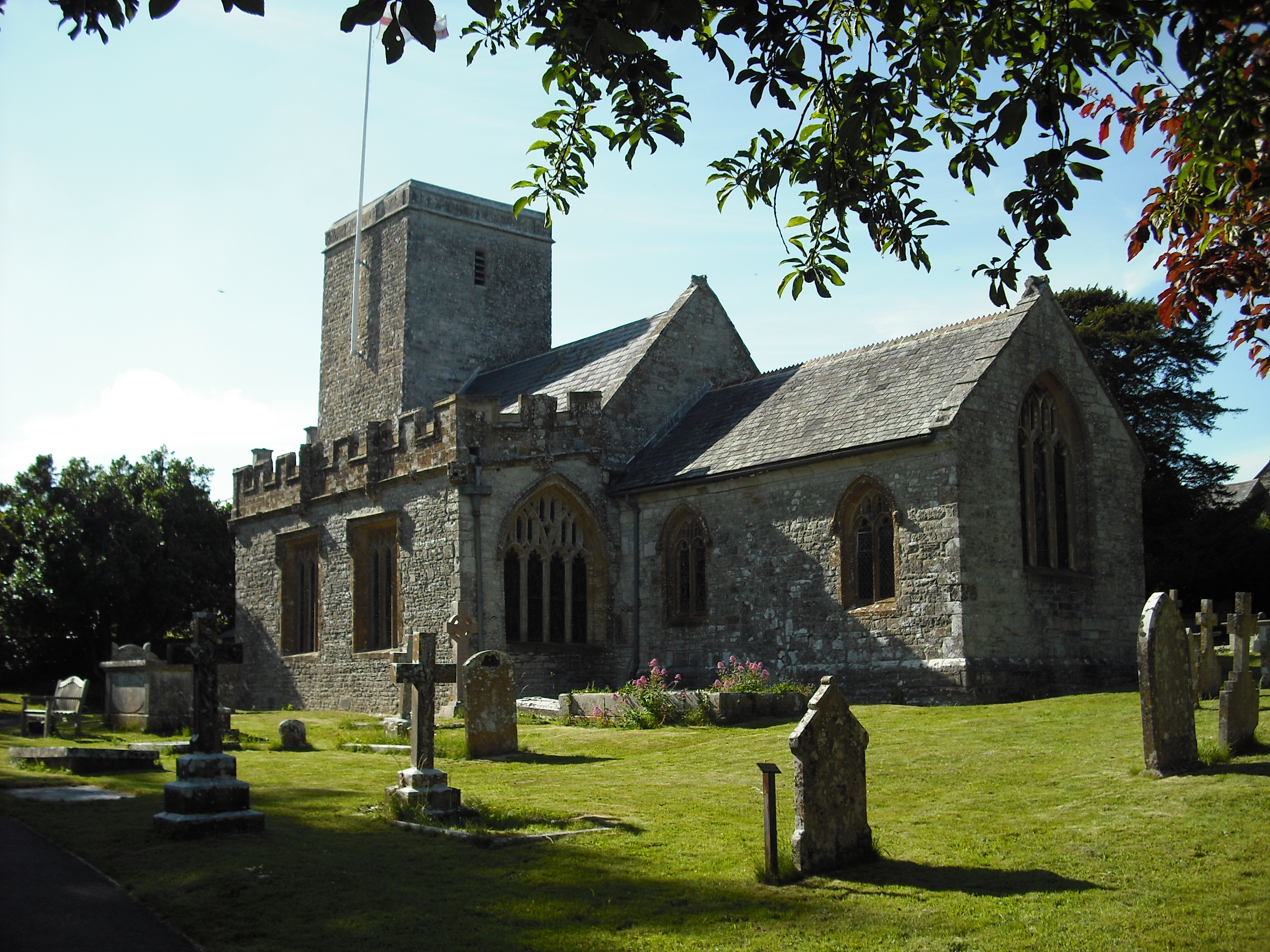
Stinsford parish church

In July 1921, Bugler announced her betrothal to a cousin, Ernest Bugler, a farmer in Beaminster. They were married on 11 September 1921. They continued farming in Beaminster. Bugler spent the next three years away from the stage. In 1923, she appeared in a local play The Beaminster Road in the rectory garden in Stoke Abbott. Also in 1923 she was due to appear in a play based on Hardy's Desperate Remedies but withdrew when she became pregnant. Her first baby was stillborn, but the couple went on to have a daughter Diana in March 1924.

=== 1924: Tess in Dorchester ===
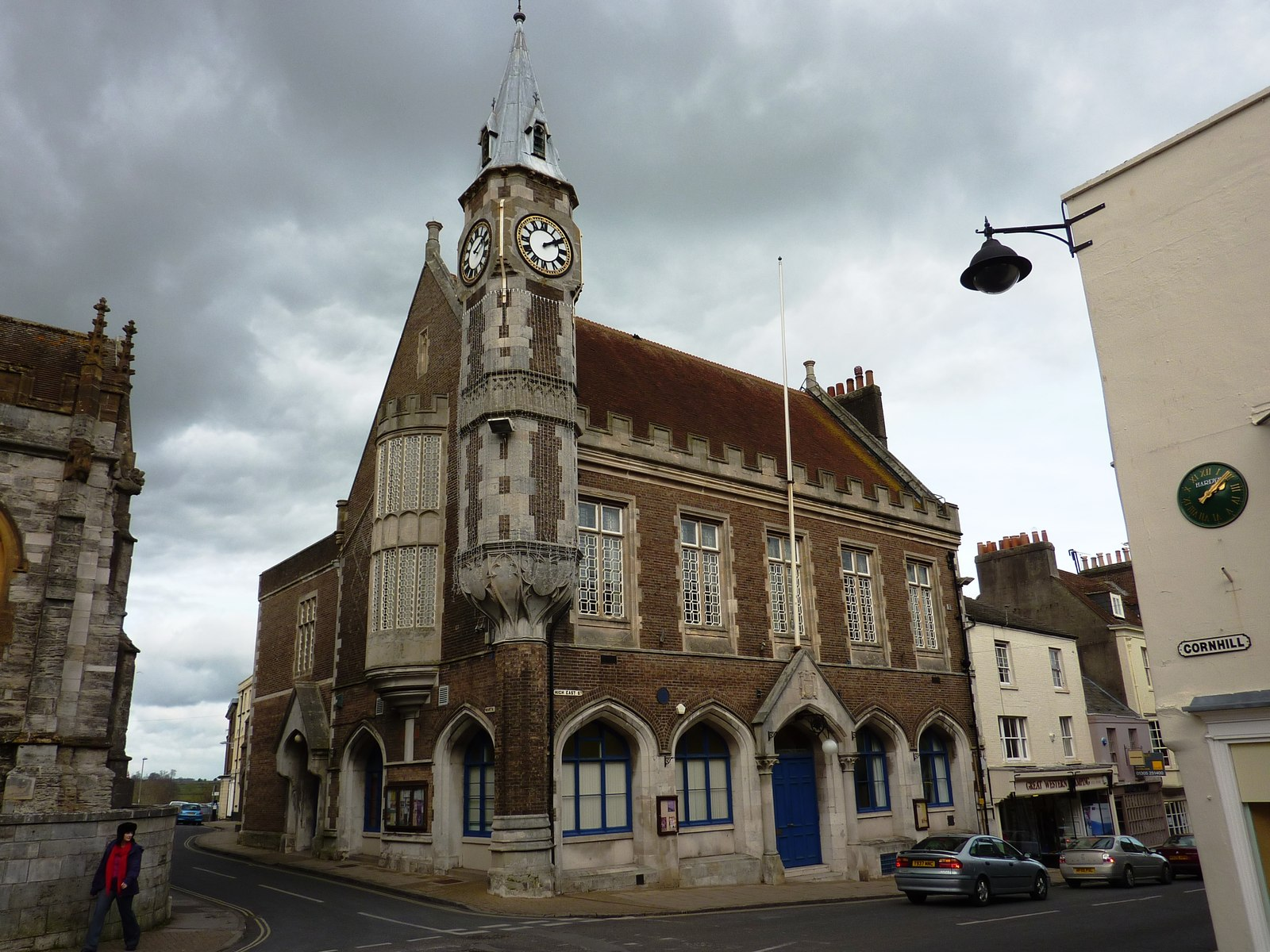
Dorchester Corn Exchange

In 1924, Hardy adapted Tess of the d'Urbervilles and cast Bugler in the title role. Interviewed about her role, Bugler said that the character was controversial. "A friend of my father was shocked ... Even to-day there are people who think I am not quite nice to appear in 'Tess'," though the Leeds Mercury responded that acting is about "imaginative interpretation", not "autobiographical expression" so Bugler would "live down the prejudice". Another interviewee was concerned about how London critics, drawn to Dorchester by Hardy's name, would respond to an amateur production.

The play opened in Dorchester on 26 November 1924 at the Corn Exchange. The Daily Mail described it as "less a play in the accepted sense than four outstanding episodes ... told in the language of the book", and reported that the production's "beauty ... lay chiefly in the acting of Tess by Mrs Gertrude Bugler". The Yorkshire Post likewise reported that the script was "in many cases apparently reproduced from the text" and that Bugler "adds that role to the several of the Wessex heroines in which she has made successes."

=== First London performance of Tess ===
The success of the 1924 performances in Dorchester raised expectations of a London production. Hardy made plans to take the play to London with Bugler in the lead role. She was then approached by Frederick Harrison who leased and managed the Haymarket Theatre. They had been introduced to each other at a Dorchester rehearsal and he then wrote to her in January 1925 inviting her to play 'Tess' in a series of matinées provisionally scheduled for April or May. Around the same time, Hardy approved a new MacMillan edition of the book illustrated with pictures of Bugler.

Hardy's wife Florence Dugdale had been jealous of Hardy's affection for Bugler even though he was at that point 83 years old and Bugler was 26 and married. Dugdale forbade bringing the Buglers to the London production. Hardy had envisaged Sybil Thorndike playing Tess if Bugler declined the role, and Lady Forbes-Robertson had enquired about it, but it was eventually taken by Gwen Ffrangcon-Davies.

Hardy's relationship with Bugler is often revisited by later biographers and critics. For example Michael Millgate accepts that Dugdale was distressed by Hardy's (unquestioned) infatuation. Christopher Nicholson turned the story into Winter, a romantic historical novel. Emma Tennant included the story in her retelling of Tess. However, Bugler's sister Norrie Woodhall always maintained that the relationship was platonic. She wrote that Florence's "insane jealousy of my sister was all in her mind". In his scathing review of Winter in the Hardy Society Journal, Keith Wilson concludes that Hardy may have been unwisely admiring and protective of Bugler but blames the gossip about their relationship on "the allure of sensationalism".

=== 1929 London performance ===
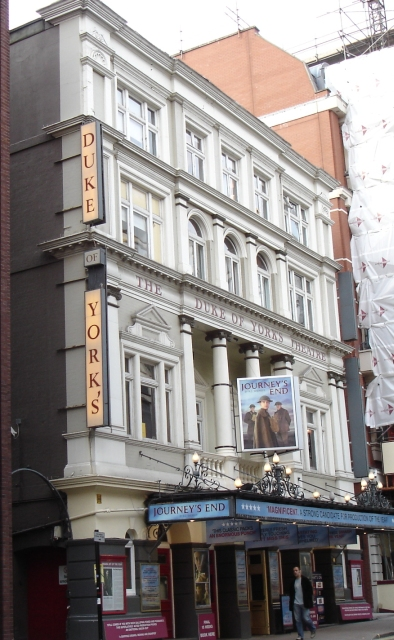
Duke of York's Theatre

After Hardy's death in 1928, Dugdale invited Bugler to play Tess in a 1929 London production at the Duke of York's Theatre. Woodhall attributes Dugdale's change of heart to guilt over her 1924 intervention. The role garnered praise for her sensitive performance and natural charm. However, J. P. Wearing states that the reviews were decidedly mixed, a view shared by Bugler herself.

Advance publicity emphasised Bugler's authentic background, her connection with Hardy, and the status of other cast members including Martin Lewis as "the sinister" Alec, and Barbara Gott. There was however scepticism that an amateur actress could hold her own in a professional production.

Following the first night on 23 July 1929, newspaper reviews continued to note her authentic background as (in the language of the time) a farmer's wife, a farmer's daughter, or a tradesman's daughter. They praised aspects of her performance but lamented her lack of training in performing and in responding to the audience. They also commented on contrasts in style between her approach and that of the professional cast members giving an inconsistent overall effect. The most positive first-night reviews were enthusiastic about her natural approach and her popularity with the audience.

Later reviews continued in similar vein. Vaughan Dryden, in the Sporting Times, referred to her "nervous tension", and the "resentment and jealousy ... [of] out-of-work professional actresses". The Stage reviewer was critical but more positive, drawing attention to her becoming more expressive as the performance progressed. The Illustrated London News attributed this to the play itself coming to life in later scenes where "the best-trained artist could not be more sincere or more poignantly effective". The Civil and Military Gazette added that "in the heart-breakingly moving finale at Stonehenge she recaptures for us, just for a few moments, the fleeting haunting beauty of the book."

Bugler's inclusion in the cast inspired longer articles on wider topics. For example Herbert Farjeon wrote a full-page essay in The Graphic beginning: "The revival of Tess of the D'Urbervilles at the Duke of York's Theatre brings me face to face with those two fearsome questions – What is a good play? What is good acting?" "G.F.H." in The Sketch lamented that "so much has been lost in the adaptation for the stage that nothing producer or player can do makes sufficient compensation" and "the unwisdom of rooting up an amateur actress from her surroundings." "Trinculo" in Tatler asked:

Are we to assume that every hunchback is a potential Richard the Third? That acting is merely an accident of birth or a matter of appearance? That the art of being natural is to ignore technique? It must in fairness be recorded that the majority of an enthusiastic audience appeared to answer these questions in the affirmative"

The play had a successful run of sixty performances. After finishing its run, the play toured to King's Theatre, Hammersmith and the Hippodrome Margate, after which Bugler and two other actors withdrew.

=== Later life ===
After enjoying her moment in the sun, Bugler, now married with a daughter and an ailing mother (who later died in 1940), stopped acting and returned to Dorchester, living to the age of 95. She maintained an interest in the theatre. In 1930 she produced a play for Beaminster Show. In 1938 she was "coaching and casting" for the Melplash Players. In 1939, she gave a talk on the radio titled "Thomas Hardy at Max Gate", part of a series The House and the Man. Bugler later wrote about her experiences in Personal Recollections of Thomas Hardy, published by The Dorset Natural History and Archaeological Society in 1962.

== Bibliography ==
- "Personal recollections of Thomas Hardy", (Gertrude Bugler, The Dorset Natural History and Archaeological Society, 1962)
- "The Life of Thomas Hardy: A Critical Biography", (Paul Turner, 2001)
- "Thomas Hardy: A Biography Revisited", (Michael Millgate, Oxford University Press, 2004)
- "Thomas Hardy: The Guarded Life", (Ralph Pite, York University Press)
- "Thomas Hardy: The Time-torn Man", (Claire Tomalin, 2002)
- "The Pessimism of Thomas Hardy", (G. W. Sherman)
- "The London Stage 1920-1929: A Calendar of Productions, Performers, and Personnel", (J. P. Wearing, Rowman & Littlefield).
