= The Famous Tragedy of the Queen of Cornwall =

Verse tragedy by Thomas Hardy

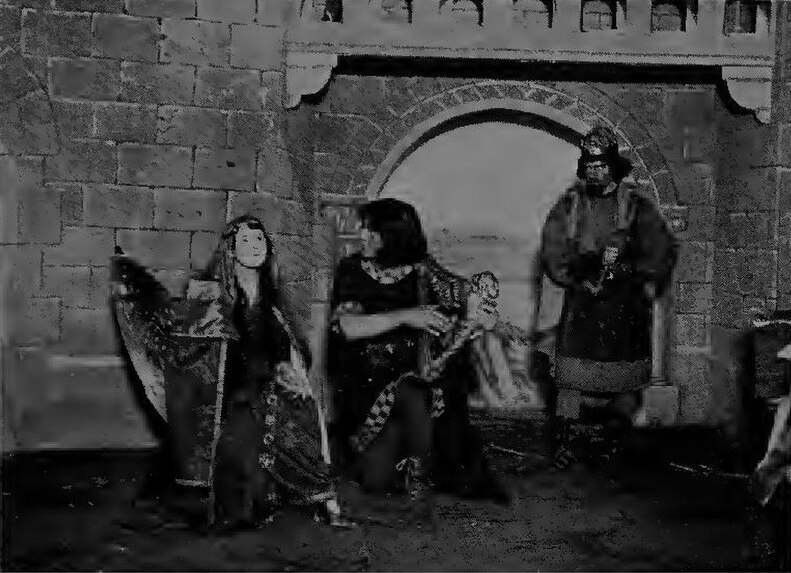
The Hardy Players in a scene from The Famous Tragedy of the Queen of Cornwall, November 1923

The Famous Tragedy of the Queen of Cornwall, or, to give its full title, The Famous Tragedy of the Queen of Cornwall at Tintagel in Lyonnesse: A New Version of an Old Story, Arranged as a Play for Mummers in One Act, Requiring No Theatre or Scenery, is a verse tragedy by Thomas Hardy based on the medieval legend of Tristan and Iseult. His last substantial creative work, it was written, published and first performed (by an amateur group, the Hardy Players) in 1923, and revised in 1924. It is now seldom performed and has had a mixed reception from critics. In 1924 it was adapted as an opera by Rutland Boughton.

== Synopsis ==
After a prologue by Merlin the play proper opens with both King Mark of Cornwall and his queen, Iseult, returning to Tintagel from separate sea-voyages. We learn that Queen Iseult has travelled toward Brittany to find her old lover, Tristram, whom she believed to be dying, and has called off her voyage only on hearing a false report that he was already dead. Suspicious of his wife, Mark has his man Andret keep watch on her. Tristram now comes to Tintagel disguised as a harper, and contrives to meet the queen alone. Tristram's wife, Iseult the Whitehanded, also arrives in search of her husband and tries to persuade him to return home. Mark discovers Tristram's presence and fatally stabs him in the back. The queen picks up the same dagger and kills Mark with it, then throws herself off the castle walls to her own death. Iseult the Whitehanded enters, discovers the bodies, and sets off on her homeward journey. The epilogue is again spoken by Merlin.

== Composition and publication ==
The history of the play goes back as far as 1870, when Hardy, living for a short while in Cornwall, began his courtship of Emma Lavinia Gifford, the woman who was to become his first wife, and visited the ruins of Tintagel Castle with her. The version of the Tristan legend he then began to plan only started to take solid form in September 1916, after Emma's death, when he revisited Tintagel along with his second wife, Florence. Though he soon put this project aside, he resumed it in 1923, finished a first draft in April of that year, and completed the play in August 1923. It was published on 15 November, and appreciatively reviewed by the critics. A second and slightly expanded edition with a different numeration of the scenes followed in September 1924.

== Early performances ==
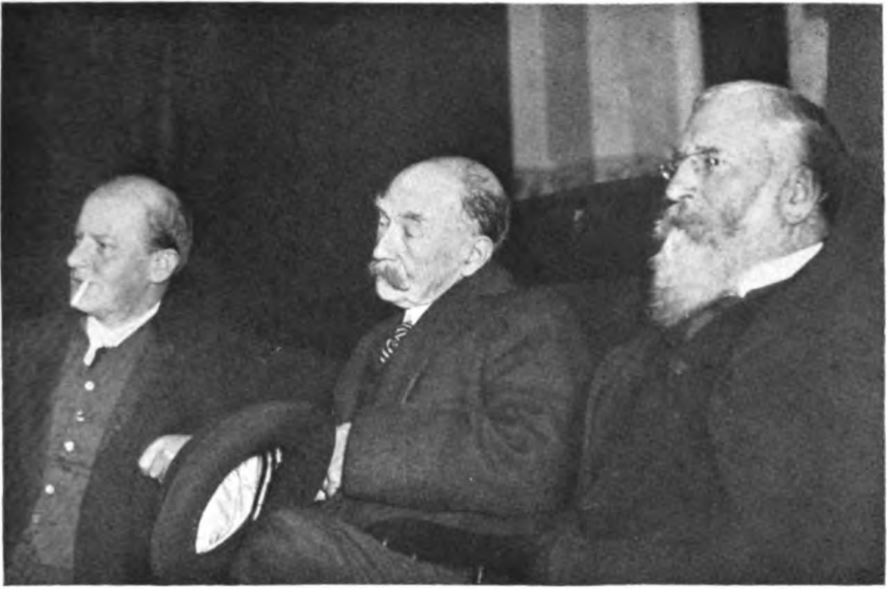
Thomas Hardy (centre) attending a rehearsal of The Queen of Cornwall at the Corn Exchange, Dorchester

The first performance of the play was given by the Hardy Players, an amateur troupe in Dorchester, and was intended to star their leading actress, Gertrude Bugler, though her pregnancy prevented this. Hardy himself was closely involved in the production, as was Harley Granville-Barker, an eminent theatrical figure to whom Hardy sent an early copy of the script and who responded with appreciative criticism of the play itself and of the approach to it of the Hardy Players, one of whose rehearsals he attended. The play was performed at the Corn Exchange in Dorchester on 28, 29 and 30 November 1923, and the Hardy Players then took the production to London to be played at King George's Hall on 21 February the following year. It was also performed in Bournemouth on 25 April 1924. Reviews noted the difficulties presented to amateur actors by the play's archaic style, The Daily Telegraph noting that "The Hardy Players did their best, but they succeeded not at all in getting down into the depths of passion which...this play might reveal in the hands of a fine professional company under a producer of mark." Even Hardy's wife Florence could only claim that these had been "more or less overcome", while admitting that the Hardy Players were better in rustic comedies. There was also a private performance by the students of the Royal Academy of Dramatic Art on 1 April 1924. There have since been very few productions, though the play was notably performed on BBC radio on 28 February 1956 (repeated the following April), with Mary Morris as Queen Iseult, Rachel Gurney as Iseult the Whitehanded, and incidental music by Norman Demuth.

== Literary sources ==
The dramatic form of The Queen of Cornwall was influenced by Hardy's respect for the conventions of Greek tragedy. Aristotle, in his Poetics, lays down that the action should all take place in the same place and within a period of 24 hours. Hardy followed both of these rules, and indeed the action of his play is in one unbroken sequence operating in real time. He also employed a chorus to comment on the unfolding plot, though he called them Chanters.

The plot is taken from the Tristan and Isolde legend as it was told and retold in medieval and modern literature. His medieval sources have been identified as the romances of Thomas of Britain, Gottfried von Strassburg, and Sir Thomas Malory. The influence of Gottfried von Strassburg's Tristan has also been detected in Tess of the d'Urbervilles and Jude the Obscure. The original medieval form of the Tristan legend has not survived, but an attempt to reconstruct it was made by the 19th-century scholar Joseph Bédier, and Hardy is known to have owned a copy of the English translation of Bédier's work.

In a letter, Hardy wrote that he had "tried to avoid turning the rude personages of, say, the fifth century, into respectable Victorians, as was done by Tennyson, Swinburne, Arnold, etc.". The works he was reacting against were Tennyson's "The Last Tournament" (1871; part of his Idylls of the King), Swinburne's Tristram of Lyonesse (1882), and Arnold's Tristram and Iseult (1852). The two former poems concentrate on Tristram's role in the story; it is only Arnold who, like Hardy, concentrates his attention on Queen Iseult and his sympathy on Iseult the Whitehanded. Hardy's device of framing the story with two monologues by Merlin is not unlike R. S. Hawker's in his "The Quest for the Sangraal", in which Merlin, by his magic art, produces a vision for King Arthur of the Quest. The critic Dennis Taylor, further, finds the play to be "full of both Shelleyan and Wagnerian echoes". One further source for The Queen of Cornwall can be found in Hardy's own novel A Pair of Blue Eyes (1873), the dialogue of which he in one scene quotes from extensively.

== Autobiographical elements ==
The Famous Tragedy of the Queen of Cornwall, completed when Hardy was in his eighties and married to his second wife, was inspired by memories of his courtship of his first wife. In 1916, when Hardy was turning over ideas for the play in his mind, he told a friend that "I visited [Tintagel] forty-four years ago with an Iseult of my own, and of course she was mixed in the vision of the other." It is, however, difficult to pin down autobiographical elements in the play. The white robe and "corn-brown hair" of Iseult the Whitehanded recall Emma Hardy, as does Tristram's description of Queen Iseult as a "lily-rose". The fact that Hardy fell in love with Emma while still engaged to another woman, Tryphena Sparks, may possibly be reflected in the depiction of a Tristram torn between his love for two Iseults. Some critics have also argued that the marital strains in the latter years of Hardy's marriage to Emma find expression in Queen Iseult's bitterness towards Tristram.

== Style ==
The verse style of The Queen of Cornwall has been variously described as "plain and archaic, in conformity with an unsophisticated age", and as employing "an ironic compression...classically laconic [with a] convoluted brevity...more in the manner of Browning". The fact that Hardy described it on the title-page as "a Play for Mummers" may explain the literary style he employed, as it certainly dictates the simplicity of staging he envisaged: the stage was to be "any large Room" without sets or scenery unless it was being played in an actual theatre.

== Reception ==
The Famous Tragedy of the Queen of Cornwall is not often read, and still less often staged. It has been seen as a minor work and has received less critical attention than many of Hardy's writings – indeed, some biographies ignore it entirely. It has been considered "heavy going", "a work of little distinction, dull and...weak", "never excitingly dramatic or highly lyrical", "too brief for the development of great tragedy", and "an undistinguished work". Ivor Brown, in one of the original reviews of the play, complained of its "combination of rare and strained words with a prosaic diction that approaches bathos", and likewise modern critics have called the verse style "clotted", "workmanlike rather than inspired", and "lack[ing]...any rich metaphorical or prosodic vitality". Yet some critics have found in the play theatrical virtues to offset its shortcomings as verse. A. L. Rowse considered it "a curious little work, easy to underestimate or misconceive", and suggested that it would benefit from the visual and sound-effects of the Cornish coastline possible in a filmed version. Raymond H. Thompson praised its "firm structure and dramatic power". Robert Gittings thought it was "on its own terms, a considerable achievement", and believed that "the dramatic power, even in awkward phrases, was unmistakable". Harold Orel wrote that "overall the elaborateness of the rhymes, the occasional soaring eloquence...and Hardy's continuing control of theatrical elements are impressive...[T]here are several moments of dark beauty that finally stir in the audience a genuine sense of pity for the plight of Iseult the Whitehanded." Beverly Taylor and Elisabeth Brewer thought it a domestic rather than a romantic tragedy of considerable power. While conceding that it "lacks tragic depth, lacks even pathos", they believed Hardy gave the story an ending "impressively different and more dramatic...than do most others."

== Adaptation ==
There swiftly followed a two-act music drama, The Queen of Cornwall, by the English composer Rutland Boughton. The libretto consisted of Hardy's play, cut in places, reworded or rearranged in others, and with the addition of six pre-existing poems by Hardy: "When I set out for Lyonnesse", "The end of the episode", "Bereft she thinks she dreams", "If it's ever spring again", "Beeny Cliff", and "Spot". It was first performed on 21 August 1924 (some sources incorrectly say 26 August) at the Glastonbury Festival, was toured to Bath and Bournemouth in April 1925, and was revived at the 1925 and 1926 Glastonbury Festivals and again on 13 January 1927 in Liverpool. In 1935 the BBC broadcast a performance conducted by Albert Coates. There was a further production of it in October 1963 at the St Pancras Festival in London.
