= The Hardy Players =

Theatrical company

The Hardy Players (1908–1928) was an amateur theatrical company, based in Dorchester, Dorset. The novelist Thomas Hardy adapted his novels for live performance in collaboration with the group. In some cases he made major changes to the story, such as changing the ending of The Trumpet Major, truncating Return of the Native and making other changes to the text to better fit dramatisation. Hardy wrote his play The Famous Tragedy of the Queen of Cornwall specifically to be performed by the Hardy Players.

== Background ==
The Players premiered many of Hardy's novels on stage. The notes and amendments that Hardy made to the novels for the adaptations, and his reasons for doing so, are of interest to Hardy scholars.

The Hardy Players’ situation, as Dorset natives, was of great significance to Hardy. As Norman Atkins put it: “This was the true Hardy, portrayed by people who lived and breathed the atmosphere of Egdon Heath and Wessex”. Hardy's novels and short stories are filled with examples of folklore – customs, songs, superstitions, witches and mummers plays. He was fascinated by the dramatic presentation of folklore and rural tradition, and his relationship with the Hardy Players gave him an opportunity to see those dramatic forms brought to life.

The plays fall into three categories: those adapted and produced by Harold Evans, those adapted by his successor Thomas Henry Tilley, and those made by Hardy himself. The most notable member of the Hardy Players was Gertrude Bugler; her younger sister Augusta (Norrie) Woodhall gained fame as the last surviving Hardy Player.

== Company history ==
=== Origins ===
The Players were members of the Dorchester Dramatic and Debating Society, which had had an active association with Hardy for many years, giving recitals of his poems and extracts of his novels at venues in and around Dorchester. In 1908, members of the Society came together to perform a dramatisation of Hardy's novel, The Trumpet-Major, adapted and produced by local chemist, Harold Evans. The troupe continued under their original name for the first few years, but had evolved into the Hardy Players by 1920.

=== Hardy and the theatre ===
Hardy's interest in the theatre dated from the 1860s. He corresponded with various would-be adapters over the years, including Robert Louis Stevenson in 1886 and Jack Grein and Charles Jarvis in the same decade. Neither adaptation came to fruition, but Hardy showed he was potentially enthusiastic about such a project. One play that was performed, however, caused him a certain amount of pain. His experience of the controversy and lukewarm critical reception that had surrounded his and Comyns Carr's adaptation of Far From the Madding Crowd in 1882 left him wary of that damage that adaptations could do to his literary reputation. So it is notable both that he so readily and enthusiastically became involved with the Hardy Players’ project, and also that he was at some pains initially to disguise his involvement in the play.

=== The first production, 1908 ===
In 1908, Harold Evans, a leading member of the Dorchester Debating and Dramatic Society, approached Hardy to ask if he could adapt The Trumpet-Major for the stage. Not only did Hardy give his permission, he became very involved in the process, working closely with Evans: the two had many discussions in the study at Max Gate “deciding on the outline of the play, writing additional dialogue” and discussing whether particular scenes should be retained or left out. At first, Hardy played down his association with the adaptation, writing to friends that no-one should print that it was by his authority and that it “no doubt will be a hash of a story, as none of the young men have any skill in dramatizing that I know of.” As late as October 1908, he wrote to Harold Child, drama critic of The Times,“I have nothing to do with the production, except in answering casual questions now & then… I imagine that, as a play, the action will not be very coherent, but the humours of the characters may be amusing.” At the same time, his letter offered Child accommodation overnight at Max Gate (at no little inconvenience to Hardy and his household) to come and review the play, and, even while disclaiming his involvement, Hardy was simultaneously extolling the reasons for its appeal, both in its unique relationship with the novel: “the great grandparents of the actors… were the real actors more or less in the scenes depicted”; and in the high social status of the principals: “the Mayor of Dorchester plays Cripplestraw, the Mayor's sister Matilda Johnson, a former Mayor's son is the trumpet major himself, & Anne is a former Mayor's daughter.”. The production was thoroughly Dorchester-based: “the scenery painted from designs by local artists; the uniforms made by a local tailor after originals “still preserved in the attics of local folk”.

The play was performed on 18 & 19 December 1908 at the Corn Exchange in Dorchester. Unfortunately, Hardy, who was now 68 years old, could not attend as he was suffering from a chill, but Emma Hardy attended. He was, however, delighted by its reception. Due to its evident association with an author of such high standing, the play received national attention. The press presence was so great, some reviewers had trouble squeezing in through the doors, and the coverage was so extensive that “A Souvenir of the Performances of the Play” was produced containing all the reviews. It ran to ten pages of dence, double-column text, and included four pages from the Dorset County Chronicle, along with excerpts from The Times, The Standard, The Daily News, The Daily Chronicle, The Morning Leader, The Referee, The Guardian, and The Bridport News. The reviews were broadly complimentary, and Hardy seems, from that point, to have become more comfortable in owning his relationship with the Hardy Players, though he was still underplaying his involvement in 1920, this time The Return of the Native, to Harold Child: “The dramatization is entirely the work of our respected Alderman, Mr. Tilley – to whom I have given no assistance whatever… They have got me to promise to go to the dress rehearsal, so I suppose I must.””. His expressed reluctance to attend is at odds with the “intense joy” he showed, watching the Players bring his work to life that year.

=== 1909-1927 ===
Following the success of The Trumpet-Major, Evans turned his attention to Far from the Madding Crowd. Hardy proclaimed that it was a “neater adaptation” than his and Comyns Carr's. The play was staged at the Corn Exchange on 17 & 18 November 1909 and, a week later, under the auspices of the Society of Dorset Men in London, it transferred for one night to the Cricklewood Institute in North London. This was followed in 1910 by an adaptation of Under the Greenwood Tree, under the title The Mellstock Quire. Hardy selected the words and music for the Christmas carols used in the play. Again, this showed first in Dorchester, followed by a performance in London on 1 December. The Trumpet-Major (along with Far From the Madding Crowd) was revived for a performance in 1910 at Weymouth Pavilion. This time Hardy was able to attend (having missed the 1908 performances due to illness), travelling there by train with Albert Evans and his family. He wrote personal congratulations afterwards to Mr Bawler (Miller Loveday) and Mayor of Dorchester Mr Tilley (Cripplestraw) on playing their roles so realistically.

In 1911, instead of an adaption of one of the novels, the Players instead, at Hardy's suggestion, put on a performance of his own play The Three Wayfarers, along with Evans adaptation of “The Distracted Preacher” from Hardy's Wessex Tales. Again, the play was performed in Dorchester (on 15 & 16 November) followed by a performance in London.

1912 saw The Trumpet-Major return, with two performances at the Corn Exchange (27 & 28 November) and one at the Cripplegate Institute on 5 December 1912. On the evening of the first Dorchester performance, it was announced that Emma Hardy had died.

By 1913, the Hardy Players had had five years of modest success in dramatising Hardy's novels. The plays were well-received locally, while Hardy's immense fame had brought national coverage and recognition of the Players’ part in interpreting Hardy's work.

For the 1913 adaptation of The Woodlanders, Marty South was played by Gertrude Bugler in her first role for the players. The seventeen-year-old daughter of a Dorchester baker and confectioner, Bugler's mother, Augusta, who was a milkmaid before she married Arthur Bugler, had coincidentally been one of the inspirations for Tess. The Buglers’ shop was used for rehearsals by the Hardy Players. Hardy was introduced to Gertrude Bugler there. She had no dramatic training, but her simple sincerity and native Dorset dialect made her a good fit for Marty. Bugler received glowing reviews from the press.

She was evidently a talented amateur actress. Her performance as Eustacia Vye in the Hardy Players’ 1920 production of Return of the Native was much admired Hardy himself was extremely taken with her, much to his second wife Florence's chagrin.

The press focus on Bugler caused tension among the cast. According to Florence Hardy, “the other members of the company are being a little upset by all the applause being given to her, and Mrs. Tilley says ‘We'd better send Miss Bugler to London alone on the 27th as the rest of us are not wanted’.”. Of the long-established players, Edwin Stevens seems to have been most outraged by Bugler's monopoly of the limelight. The Players had a dearth of young, male actors, and Stevens was far too old for his part as Damon Wildeve in Return of the Native. The Times’ review was brutal: “The trouble with the Wildeve of Mr Stevens is that one cannot understand why Eustacia should have been attracted to him. “ Stevens was so indignant at being cropped from a press photograph, where he had deliberately placed himself next to Bugler, that he refused to go on stage for one of the Dorchester performances. Only the threat of the society president going public with the reason for Wildeve's nonappearance made him relent. Tensions continued between Tilley and Stevens and other founding members of the Players, who wished to continue taking the youthful lead male roles despite being far too old.

In 1918, Evans moved away from Dorchester. Following his departure, Thomas Henry Tilley took over the lead adapting and producing for the Players, like his predecessor collaborating with Hardy over many of the productions, and in 1923 adapting the Mummers play from Return of the Native to be performed alongside Hardy's new play The Queen of Cornwall. He seems to have had an easier relationship with Hardy, who sometimes clashed with Evans. Tilley was a stone mason and builder, and, as well as acting in the earlier productions, built the sets. There is a pen-and-ink portrait of Tilley with Hardy by Harry Furniss in the National Portrait Gallery. The most famous production by the Hardy Players came during the Tilley years: Hardy's own adaptation of Tess of the d’Urbervilles in 1924.

Minutes of the Dramatic Sub-Committee of the Society 25 August 1924 contain just one item:

“Mr. T.H. Tilley reported that Mr. Thos. Hardy OM had intimated his willingness to allow the Society to produce the Play written by him some 30 years ago “Tess of the Durbervilles” but which had never been acted.”

Hardy's enthusiasm for the production was evidenced by the number of visits by leading players to Max Gate for rehearsals and tea, attendance of Hardy at rehearsals at Wool Manor and the Corn Exchange, including one in performance week that he attended with Sir James Barrie, and extensive correspondence about the possibility of a professional staging in London.

Bugler's most famous rôle was that of Tess, which brought her ecstatic reviews from the visiting press. Harold Child in The Times: “In Mrs Gertrude Bugler [The Hardy Players] have a lady who, one might almost say, was born to act the part of Tess”. However, Florence leaned on Bugler hard to turn down the opportunity to play Tess when the play transferred to London, and Bugler acquiesced.

=== 1927 Hardy's death and the disbanding of the Hardy Players ===
The Hardy Players final performance was as part of a BBC radio performance, in 1927. By this point, Hardy's direct involvement had ceased. Gertrude Bugler went on to perform in a London production of Tess (supported by Florence Hardy, perhaps to compensate for her early opposition to Bugler's taking the role to London). Bugler did not pursue a career in the theatre further, saying in later years “It was only Tess that interested me. That's all I wanted.”

=== Norrie Woodhall and the New Hardy Players (2005-) ===
In 2005, the last surviving member of the Hardy Players, Gertrude Bugler's younger sister Augusta (Norrie) Woodhall turned 100 years old. Her birthday wish was for the Hardy Players to be reformed to perform a play to celebrate her centenary. The manuscript for Tilley's 1920 adaptation of The Return of the Native, in which Gertrude Bugler had played Eustasia Vye, had just recently come to light. This was reworked by Tim Laycock for a modern audience. As with the original troupe, the New Hardy Players were drawn from the local community, some members able to trace their ancestry back to the Dorchester of Hardy's novels. For a performance on her 100th birthday, 18 December, Norrie adapted a humorous scene from Under the Greenwood Tree, in which she also played a part. The following year, this novel was chosen for the group's second production. The manifesto of the original Hardy Players was taken up by the New Hardy Players, with the same emphasis on bringing Hardy's works to life in their native setting and raising money for local charities.

The Hardy Players patron is Julian Fellowes.

=== Artifacts in the Dorset Museum ===
In 2008, a model set made by Tilley was sold at auction. The model, with interchangeable sets, was built using cardboard and glue. It was used to test scenery ideas for The Hardy Players’ performances at the Corn Exchange, and is the only known model used by them. The miniature set designs, all hand-painted in watercolours, include sets used for The Return of the Native, Tess of the D’Urbervilles and The Woodlanders. The theatre was bought by the Dorset County Museum for £2,000.

Evelyn Evans mentions the theatre in her account of her father's years with the Players: “Tilley, a builder by trade, and a most gifted comedian… constructed a model theatre (now in the possession of Mr Edward Grassby) with designs for each set, so that the Weatherbury (Puddletown) landscape could be faithfully displayed. A painting of Waterston House formed one backcloth; meadows, fir plantations, house interiors, the others”, which sets the date of its construction as 1909.

In 2010, the New Hardy Players, championed by their founder and last surviving member of the original troupe, Norrie Woodhall, raised money to buy a large collection of the play manuscripts, which are now held in the Dorset Museum. The collection contained working papers relating to all the Hardy Players’ productions, including revised and annotated scripts (often the prompt copies), actors’ parts, programmes, posters and miniature mock-up scenery. It also includes Wessex Scenes from The Dynasts (1916), an adaptation of his verse drama, originally staged in aid of the British and Russian Red Cross, The Famous Tragedy of the Queen of Cornwall (1923) which Hardy wrote to be performed by the Hardy Players, and Hardy's own 1924 adaptation of Tess of the d’Urbervilles. With the support of the University of Exeter and the County Museum, by April 2010, the New Hardy Players had raised nearly £60,000, enough to buy the manuscripts.

==== Hardy Players Manifesto ====
Among the papers was a draft manifesto, identified as having been written by Tilley and “corrected and approved” by Hardy. It states:

“All that the works of Mr Hardy owe to the ancient dialect, customs, and folklore, the quaint rustic wit & wisdom, the home-crafts & field crafts, … not only are these things dear to the cast, but they are able to represent them on stage by the instinct of relationship. For they are local men & women who, pursuing their daily rounds amid the Dorset dialect & scenery, have been long familiarised with the speech, the dwellings & the habits of the characters portrayed in the novels. “By endeavouring to represent the old-world life of Wessex the players are undoubtedly performing a valuable literary & historical work… [They] not only help to preserve a rich and philologically interesting dialect that may, under modern conditions of life, all too quickly disappear, but to awaken in their audiences an interest in local history & literature & encourage the study of what William Barnes, the Dorsetshire poet so admirably termed ‘speechcraft’.”

== Productions ==
=== Hardy Players productions 1908-1927 ===
Further details of the productions can be found on the University of Ottawa website

- 1908 The Trumpet-Major, adapted by Alfred H. Evans – 18 & 19 November 1908 (Corn Exchange, Dorchester)
- 1909 Far from the Madding Crowd, adapted by Evans – 17 & 18 November 1909 (Corn Exchange, Dorchester); 24 November 1909 (Cripplegate Institute, London); 20 December 1909 (Herrison, Dorchester)
- 1910 Far from the Madding Crowd – 7 February 1910 (Pavilion, Weymouth)
- 1910 The Trumpet-Major – 8 February 1910 (Pavilion, Weymouth)
- 1910 The Mellstock Quire, adapted by Evans from Under the Greenwood Tree. 16, 17 & 18 November 1910 (Corn Exchange, Dorchester); 1 December 1910 (Cripplegate Institute, London)
- 1911 The Mellstock Quire – 9 February 1911 (Pavilion, Weymouth)
- 1911 The Three Wayfarers, adapted by Thomas Hardy from his short story The Three Strangers, and The Distracted Preacher, adapted by Evans – 15, 16 & 17 November 1911 (Corn Exchange, Dorchester); 27 November 1911 (Cripplegate Institute, London); 15 December 1911 (Pavilion, Weymouth)
- 1912 The Trumpet-Major (revised), adapted by Evans – 27 & 28 November 1912 (Corn Exchange, Dorchester); 5 December 1912 (Cripplegate Institute, London)
- 1913 The Woodlanders, adapted by Evans. 19 & 20 (2) November 1913 (Corn Exchange, Dorchester); 8 December 1913 (Cripplegate Institute, London); 22 January 1914 (Pavilion, Weymouth)
- 1916 Wessex Scenes from The Dynasts, adapted by Thomas Hardy – 22 June 1916 (Weymouth); 6 & 7 December 1916 (Corn Exchange, Dorchester)
- 1918 The Mellstock Quire (revised), adapted by Evans – 31 January & 1 February 1918 (Corn Exchange, Dorchester)
- 1920 The Return of the Native, adapted by T.H. Tilley. 17, 18 (2), 19 & 20 November 1920 (Corn Exchange, Dorchester)
- 1921 The Return of the Native – 27 January 1921 (Cripplegate Institute, London)
- 1922 A Desperate Remedy, adapted by Tilley from Desperate Remedies– 15, 16 & 17 November 1922 (Corn Exchange, Dorchester); 21 November 1922 (King's Hall, Covent Garden, London)
- 1923 The Famous Tragedy of the Queen of Cornwall, “O Jan! O Jan! O Jan!” and “The Play of “Saint George” by Thomas Hardy. 28, 29, 30 November & 1 December 1923 (Corn Exchange, Dorchester)
- 1924 The Famous Tragedy of the Queen of Cornwall, “O Jan! O Jan! O Jan!” and “Old-Time Rustic Wedding Scene” – 21 February 1924 (King George's Hall, Tottenham Court Road, London)
- 1924 Tess, adapted by Thomas Hardy from Tess of the d’Urbervilles – 26, 27, 28 & 29 November 1924 (Corn Exchange, Dorchester); 11 December 1924 (Pavilion, Weymouth)
- 1927 The Three Wayfarers – 30 December 1927, as part of “The Wessex Programme”, BBC broadcast, the Players presented The Three Wayfarers, with much the same cast as had performed 15 years earlier

=== New Hardy Players’ productions 2005- ===
- 2005 Return of the Native – adapted from Tilley's 1920 script by Tim Laycock
- 2006 Under the Greenwood Tree
- 2007 A Life of Three Strands
- 2008 The Waiting Supper and The Thieves who Couldn't Help Sneezing
- 2009 The Mayor of Casterbridge
- 2010 The Distracted Preacher
- 2011 Tess of the d’Urbervilles – adapted by Devina Symes from Hardy's 1924 script.
- 2012 The London Hermit or Rambles in Dorsetshire (written by John O'Keeffe in 1798 while on holiday in Lulworth)
- 2013 The Woodlanders
- 2014 Wessex Scenes – from the original 1916 script, supplied by the Dorset County Museum
- 2015 The Return of the Native
- 2016 Under the Greenwood Tree
- 2017–present “Tea with Mr Hardy” – extracts from Hardy plays, and dramatisations, from diary entries and other sources, of visits to the Hardys by eminent guests such as Sir James Barrie, Virginia Woolf, Hamo and Agatha Thornycroft, Sir Frederick Treves, Marie Stopes and others
- 2018 A Courthouse Christmas – including the mummers play from Return of the Native
- 2018 The Trumpet-Major
- 2019 A Courthouse Christmas
- 2019 Far from the Madding Crowd
- 2021 The Mayor of Casterbridge

== Notable actors past and present ==
- Gertrude Bugler
- Norrie Woodhall
- Tim Laycock
