= The Trumpet-Major =

1880 novel by Thomas Hardy

- First edition of the novel
- Author: Thomas Hardy
- Language: English
- Genre: Novel
- Publisher: Spottiswoode & Co.
- Publication date: 15 December 1880
- Publication place: England

The Trumpet-Major is the seventh published novel by English author Thomas Hardy published in 1880, and his only historical novel. Hardy included it with his "romances and fantasies". It concerns the heroine, Anne Garland, being pursued by three suitors: John Loveday, the eponymous trumpet major in a British regiment, honest and loyal; his brother Bob, a flighty sailor; and Festus Derriman, the cowardly nephew of the local squire. Unusually for a Hardy novel, the ending is not entirely tragic; however, there remains an ominous element in the probable fate of one of the main characters.

The novel is set in Weymouth during the Napoleonic Wars; the town was then anxious about the possibility of invasion by Napoleon. Of the two brothers, John fights with Wellington in the Peninsular War, and Bob serves with Nelson at Trafalgar. The Napoleonic Wars was a setting that Hardy would use again in his play, The Dynasts, and it borrows from the same source material.

Edward Neill has called the novel an attempt to repeat the success of his earlier work Far from the Madding Crowd (1874), after the limited success of his intervening works. The novel originally appeared in 1880 in the Evangelical serial Good Words (January–December) with 33 illustrations by John Collier. The three-volume first edition was published in October 1880.

== Plot ==
=== Window overlooking the Down ===
It's 1804 and England expects an invasion attempt by Napoleon Bonaparte's armies. Near Budmouth (Weymouth) Anne Garland lives with her widowed mother in part of a flour mill, next to their landlord and friend miller William Loveday. Thousands of soldiers pitch camp on the downs nearby, ready to meet the invasion. Anne attracts the admiration of two of them, both with local connections: Trumpet Major John Loveday, the decent and thoughtful son of the miller, and Yeomanry officer Festus Derriman, the boastful and aggressive nephew of the skinflint local squire. Anne favours John and loathes Festus, but Festus pesters her, a situation not helped by her mother's desire for her to marry him on account of his rank and (assumed) wealth. However, when her mother changes her view (partly due to the miller's courting of her) and favours marriage to John, Anne changes her mind and favours Festus, thinking herself too ‘high’ for a miller's son.

Into all this walks Bob Loveday, the miller's younger son, home from a life in the merchant navy. Anne has a secret passion for him (they were childhood sweethearts), but he has brought home Matilda, a prospective bride whom he met just two weeks earlier in Southampton. John and Matilda recognise each other, and after a private conversation about her past she does a midnight flit. John tells Bob what's happened, and although Bob understands, he can't help resenting John's intervention. Miller Loveday and Mrs Garland marry, John's regiment moves away (with neither Anne, Bob nor Festus sorry to see him go), and Anne turns her focus to Bob. Anne plays hard to get with Bob, while Festus continues to pester her. She discovers that John sent Matilda away for honourable reasons (she'd previously thought he'd done it to elope with her), and writes him an apologetic letter, which he misinterprets as encouragement. Festus's uncle insists on telling Anne where he's hidden his will and other documents, but she drops the (cryptic) details in a field, where they're found by a mysterious woman.

=== The Conversation in the Crowd ===
The invasion beacons are lit, although it's a false alarm. In the chaos Festus almost has Anne at his mercy in an isolated cottage. She escapes and is found by John. He finds Festus and beats him, but drunken Festus thinks he's Bob. John thinks he has a chance with Anne but discovers she's with Bob, so to cover his embarrassment he pretends to be in love with an unnamed actress at the Budmouth theatre. Pressed to show Anne and Bob his sweetheart, John buys them tickets for the play, which is also attended by the King and Queen, who are staying in Budmouth. Matilda appears on stage, and John's shocked expression is mistaken for passion. Festus, lurking as always, encounters Matilda (who is also the mysterious woman from earlier) out for a late-night walk. The press gang (naval recruiters who force men into service) are in town, and Festus and Matilda tip them off that Bob is an experienced sailor. The press gang come to the mill, but Bob escapes, with help from Matilda, who regrets her earlier action.

Bob, however, feels increasing guilty about not serving his country. Discovering that John still loves Anne tips the balance, and Bob persuades local man Captain Hardy (real-life captain of Nelson's flagship, HMS Victory) to take him on board, thus doing his duty and leaving the way clear for John. Anne goes to Portland Head to watch the Victory sail past. In Budmouth she sits crying, and is comforted by the King, who is passing by. The Loveday family endure a long wait for news of the Victory, eventually hearing of the Battle of Trafalgar, but not whether Bob has survived. Finally a sailor comes to tell them that Bob is unharmed – but also that he's engaged to a baker's daughter in Portsmouth.

=== A Delicate Situation ===
John sees his chance, but Anne rejects him. Meanwhile, Festus discovers that John, not Bob, beat him up, and courts Matilda in the mistaken belief that this will upset John. Over a year or more, Anne begins to warm to John, and he is ecstatic – until a letter comes from Bob, saying he still wants Anne. John tries to be cold towards Anne, but this only makes her warmer towards him, until she virtually proposes to him, just as Bob, newly promoted to Naval Lieutenant, writes to say he's coming home for her. Bob arrives and John withdraws. Anne rejects Bob, but he wears her down with his naval tales and fine uniform. However, when he makes his big move, she rejects him again, and he storms out. Anne is worried that he'll do something stupid, but is distracted by Squire Derriman, who arrives asking her to hide his deeds box, as Festus and his new fiancée Matilda are searching the house for it. She hides it in a window seat.

=== A Call on Business ===
Bob returns in good temper; he's been drinking with his new best friend, Festus. Anne yields to Bob, saying that if he can behave himself with the ladies for six months she'll be his. Then it turns out that Festus is waiting outside; he comes in, Anne flees, and watching from a hole in the floor of the room above, sees Squire Derriman sneak in and try to retrieve the box. Festus catches him, but Bob intervenes. Derriman snatches the box and disappears, with Festus and Matilda in pursuit. The next morning Squire Derriman is found dead from exhaustion, but the box has disappeared. It's eventually found hidden in Anne's room. Derriman has left all his property to Anne, except for a few small houses which will provide Festus with a living, but not luxury.

Festus and Matilda are married, Anne and Bob are to be engaged, and John's regiment is posted away to battle in Spain, where, we are told, he will die.

== Themes ==
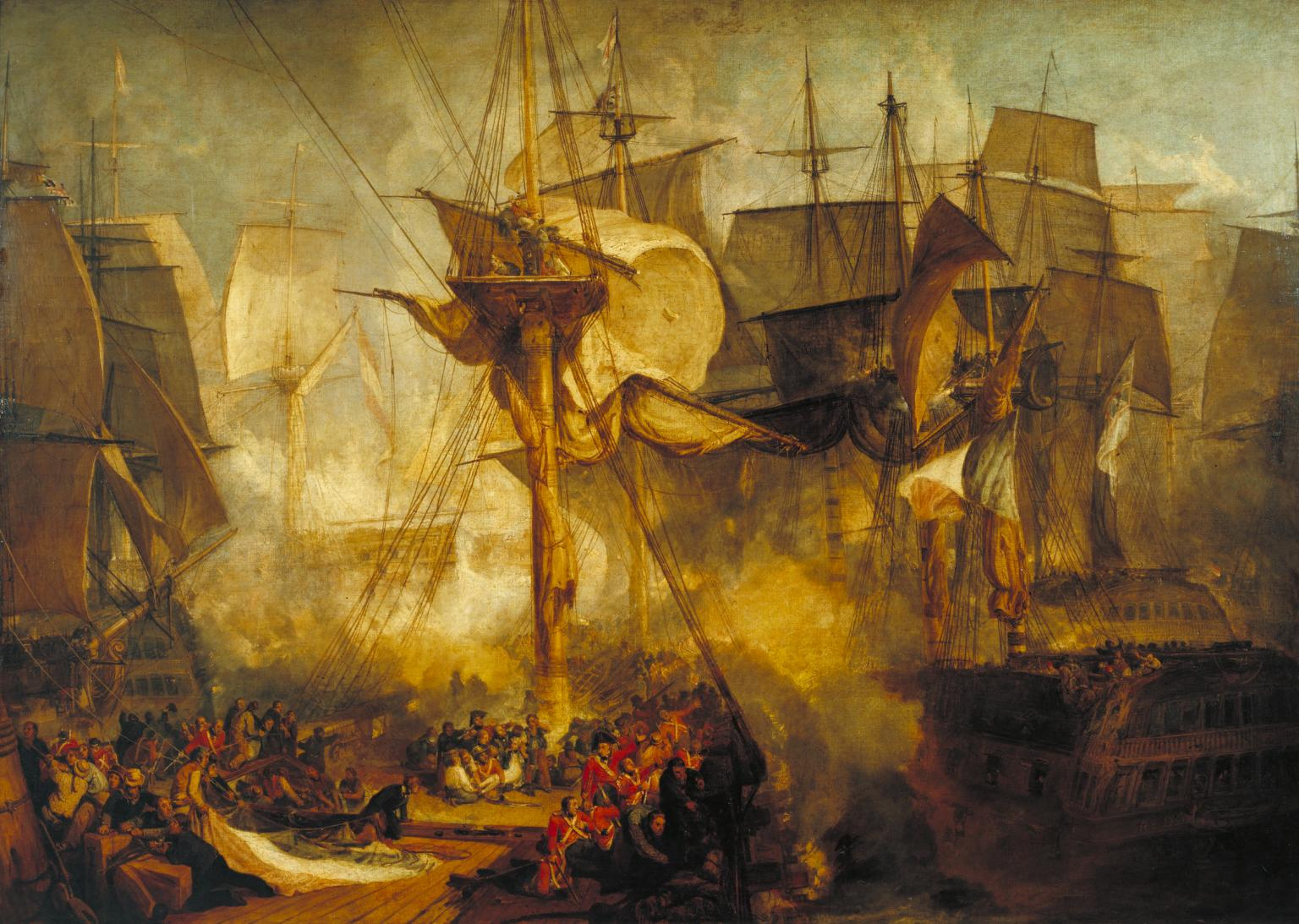
The Battle of Trafalgar by J.M.W. Turner, 1808. The novel is set during the Napoleonic Wars, when an invasion of Britain by the French was widely feared and was the time of men volunteering to defend the country and to extinguish the French threat.

Hardy, who distrusted empiricism when it come to novels and history, as he felt it marginalized many important aspects of human elements. The Trumpet-Major tells the tale of a woman, who is courted by three men during the early 19th century in the midst of the Napoleonic Wars, during the backdrop of an much anticipated and amphibious landing of Napoleon's army on the British isles. In this setting, in which he explores the subversive effects and nature of ordinary human beings such when desire and conflicting loyalties on the systemized versions of history. As Hardy's only novel of historical fiction, it makes stand out among some of Hardy's more moral works.

Like some of Hardy's other famous and popular novels such as Tess of the d'Urbervilles and The Mayor of Casterbridge such often implore and deal with deep concepts such as disappointment in love and the "perversity of life", but The Trumpet-Major also deal with these very themes present in many novels and poems which are often laid with a carefully controlled elegiac feeling and much irony in them that make them stand out among the Victorian classical works of literature.

== Sources ==
The book is unusual for being the only one of novels for which he wrote preliminary notes, in a pocket book traditionally labelled as 'The Trumpet-Major Notebook'. It is also perhaps extraordinary in the extent to which Hardy aimed for historical accuracy; to that end, he conducted research at the British Museum and consulted various periodicals and newspaper accounts of the time. Richard H. Taylor has noted the accuracy of Hardy's details in the novel.

The novel is set during a time of great national fervour and patriotism when a French invasion of Britain was anticipated. The novel also highlights as the French could anytime invade Britain, the emotions of the British people who feared an invasion were already cautious mid way through the novel.

This novel is based on stories told by his grandmother when he was a child and he fondly remembered her for the storyteller she was. Other sources include that Hardy, as a young man, would visit and spoke to the Chelsea Pensioners about the Peninsular War and the Hundred Days campaign in which Napoleon was utterly defeated by the British army of the Duke of Wellington at the Battle of Waterloo.

== Operatic version ==
Thomas Hardy's novel provided the source of Alun Hoddinott's opera The Trumpet Major, with libretto by Myfanwy Piper, first performed in Manchester on 1 April 1981.

== Adaptations ==
=== Stage and Theatre ===
In 1908, the original Hardy Players put on a dramatised version of The Trumpet-Major at the Corn Exchange in Dorchester. Hardy was very involved with the play, working closely with its producer, Alfred Evans, whose daughter Evelyn later recounted that the two had many discussions in the study at Max Gate ‘deciding on the outline of the play, writing additional dialogue’ and discussing whether particular scenes should be retained or left out. There were departures from the novel: while the novel ends of a tragic note, with John Loveday going off to his death on the battlefields of Spain, as Evelyn Evans writes: ‘the curtain of the re-written play fell on laughter, song and dancing.’ Hardy attended some rehearsals at the Corn Exchange, remarking on the fact that many of the performers were direct descendants of Dorset inhabitants who had lived through those turbulent times. Indeed, the production was thoroughly Dorchester-based: ‘the scenery painted from designs by local artists; the uniforms made by a local tailor after originals that had been worn by the Dorset Rangers’ and other local militia groups (the originals ‘still preserved in the attics of local folk’). Music was composed by a local musician, Frederick Boynton Smith. Unfortunately, Hardy, who was now 68 years old, couldn't attend the play as he was suffering from a chill, but Emma Hardy was there. He was, however, delighted by its reception. The production caused quite a stir. As the Dorset County Chronicle reported: ‘there were to be observed in the front seats a posse of leading dramatic critics who had come down from London especially’, writing ‘critiques, to be wired to Town piping hot from their busily plying pencils.’ The Times devoted nearly a column to its review of the play and a leading article two days later: extraordinary exposure for an amateur company in a small county town, but clear evidence of Hardy's status as an author of international standing. The reviews were so numerous that the company produced a souvenir programme containing extracts of them all. It runs to thousands of words: ten pages, double-columned and in very small print. As Captain Acland, curator of the Dorset County Museum wrote to Evans after watching the play: ‘thanks, not only for the genuine treat it was to us all, but because you and your talented company have proved afresh to the world what Dorchester folk can do.’ In 1910, the play was revived at the Weymouth Pavilion, and Hardy was able to attend, travelling there by train with Albert Evans and his family. He wrote personal congratulations afterwards to Mr Bawler (Miller Loveday) and Mayor of Dorchester Mr Tilley (Cripplestraw) on playing their roles so realistically. The play was again revived in 1912, for a performance at the Cripplegate Institute in London, which came with a very fine programme, including photos of the principal actors, engravings of Hardy's birthplace and ‘Casterbridge from Ten Hatches’ and the songs from the play, written by Hardy and with music by Harry Pouncy and Boyton Smith.

=== In music and musicals ===
In 1958 The Musicmakers presented a "new musical in three acts" titled Farewell my Fancy at the Everyman Theatre in Reading. With book, music and lyrics by Michael Wild, the piece was a musical comedy "suggested" by The Trumpet Major and it featured all the major characters of the book. It was given six performances from 24 to 29 November 1958. A note of apology in the programme suggests that it was not authorised by the Hardy Estate.

== Historical analysis ==
=== Hardy, The Trumpet Major and the Napoleonic Wars ===
The Napoleonic Wars, and in particular the fear of invasion that pervaded Dorset at the beginning of the 19th century, were a source of fascination to Hardy from boyhood onwards. Hardy's interest in the Napoleonic Wars continued throughout his life. While writing The Return of the Native, in 1878, Hardy visited the Reading Room of the British Museum and read contemporary accounts of the Napoleonic Wars. He noted his findings in what became known as ‘The Trumpet-Major Notebook’ (now in the Dorset Museum). Hardy also met with Chelsea pensioners who had experienced the war first-hand. The Trumpet-Major, published in 1880 was born of that research. Evelyn Evans, daughter of the man who produced Hardy's plays, mentions that, shortly after the publication of The Dynasts, and while the first theatrical production of The Trumpet-Major was in rehearsal, in 1908, Hardy talked with veterans of Waterloo still alive and living in the neighbourhood. Unlike most Hardy novels, in which the essence of the story is fictional – though often with reference to contemporary matters (such as changes in divorce law playing a part in The Woodlanders) – the real events of 1804-5 when Dorset was preparing for the palpable threat of French invasion near Weymouth (Budmouth) permeate The Trumpet Major, a danger that only receded with victory at Trafalgar. Hardy was born in 1840, some 35 years after this period, and it's not hard to imagine him sitting, as a child, listening to first-hand accounts of life in Dorset during that time and the way in which it dominated local people's lives. The sense of these real recollections is woven into The Trumpet-Major – from Anne Garland and the old sailor watching out for the Victory in the English Channel, to the pervasive fear of press-gangs and imminent invasion, to the news freshly brought of the Battle of Trafalgar and death of Nelson, told with both intimacy and a sense of its historical momentousness. The love story at the centre of the novel plays like a complex dance, with the two brothers, John and Bob Loveday and the villainous Festus Derriman all trying to gain the hand of Anne Garland. The sense of impending peril, with the ultimate fate of the young men unknown, in a time of war, serves to make the lightness and comedy that runs through The Trumpet-Major bittersweet, but the novel is all the deeper and richer for that sense of a tragic epilogue.

== The Trumpet-Major and Harlequinade ==
=== The harlequinade tradition ===
The feeling that the characters are playing out a complex dance is not a coincidence. The story can be read as a variation on the traditional harlequinade, which in turn came from the old Italian Commedia dell'arte. In Victorian times, the harlequinade had become a popular form of theatre, burlesque and ballet. The characters and action in The Trumpet-Major mirror closely the characters and themes of this traditional form, as shown below.

==== The Characters ====
- Bob Loveday – Harlequin: Harlequin is the romantic male lead in the harlequinade. A servant, and in love with Columbine, in Commedia dell'arte, Harlequin was often mischievous. In English harlequinade, his character was more romantic (but fickle). He dresses in elaborate, colourful costume, and is portrayed as acrobatic. His high spirits and wit work to save him from the scrapes he gets himself into. It is easy to see Bob as Harlequin. He dresses in eye-catching finery ‘pantaloons and boots of the newest make; yards and yards of muslin wound round his neck, … two fancy waistcoats, … and coat-buttons like circular shaving glasses.’ He struts around in his new uniform to impress Anne; and, just like Harlequin, he is susceptible to falling in love with any available young woman when he's away from Anne. A strong tradition of the harlequinade was Harlequin's great ‘Leap’. Bob's huge leap into an apple tree to escape the press-gang, ‘his figure flying like a raven’s across the sky’, is typical of this. His subsequent escape through a trap-door in the mill is as theatrical a piece of acrobatics as any found in Commedia dell'arte. That pursuit of Anne and Bob by the press-gang, incidentally, is closely based on one of the theatrical rituals of the Italian comedy: ‘The Chase’. In this, Columbine and her lover were typically hotly pursued by authority.
- Anne Garland – Columbine: Columbine is a pretty young woman who has caught the eye of Harlequin. Sometimes she is the female equivalent of Harlequin, dressed in similar costume. In the original Commedia dell'arte, she was either Pantaloon's daughter or servant. In the English harlequinade, she is always Pantaloon's daughter or ward. Her role usually centres on her romantic relationship with Harlequin. Anne Garland is a typical Columbine, demure but playful, vascillating between the brothers John and Bob Loveday. Her prettiness is counterpointed with her strength of character: ‘beneath all that was charming and simple… there lurked a real firmness, unperceived at first, as the speck of colour lurks unperceived in the heart of the palest parsley flower’; and her playfulness is evident throughout the text.
- Squire Derriman – Pantaloon: In Commedia dell'arte, Pantaloon was a greedy merchant obsessed with money and master of Columbine. Despite his cunning, he is often duped by Harlequin. In the English harlequinade, Pantaloon became the elderly father of Columbine, jealously guarding his daughter from suitors. He tries to keep the lovers apart, but is always outwitted by the young hero. Squire Derriman, likewise, is guileful, neurotic, old and wizened. Although he is not Anne's father or guardian, Anne is his heiress. His fondness for Anne mirrors Pantaloon's feeling for Columbine.
- Festus Derriman – Captain: The Captain exaggerated his past exploits, was courageous about the idea of fighting, and cowardly when faced with actual danger. He was usually drunken and incompetent. Festus has all of these characteristics, boasting to Anne, for instance, about his fighting prowess (while demonstrating his incompetence), hiding with the women when there's a rumour of invasion, and partial to drink.
- Matilda Johnson – Soubrette: Soubrette was a minor character in Commedia dell'arte, who sometimes married Harlequin, sometimes Pantaloon. Like Matilda, she is characterised by her loose morals, love of life and enjoyment of intrigue.
- And finally, John Loveday, the Trumpet-Major himself – Pierrot: In Commedia dell'arte, Pierrot was a comic servant character, often naïve, and always heart-broken by his unrequited love for Columbine. The French version of Pierrot became something of a 19th-century ‘meme’: a melancholy, white-faced figure, pensive and silent. John Loveday is a thoughtful, simple-hearted man. His pallor is often remarked on, too – a nod at Pierrot's painted white face.
