= Municipal Buildings, Dorchester =

Municipal building in Dorset, England

Municipal Buildings
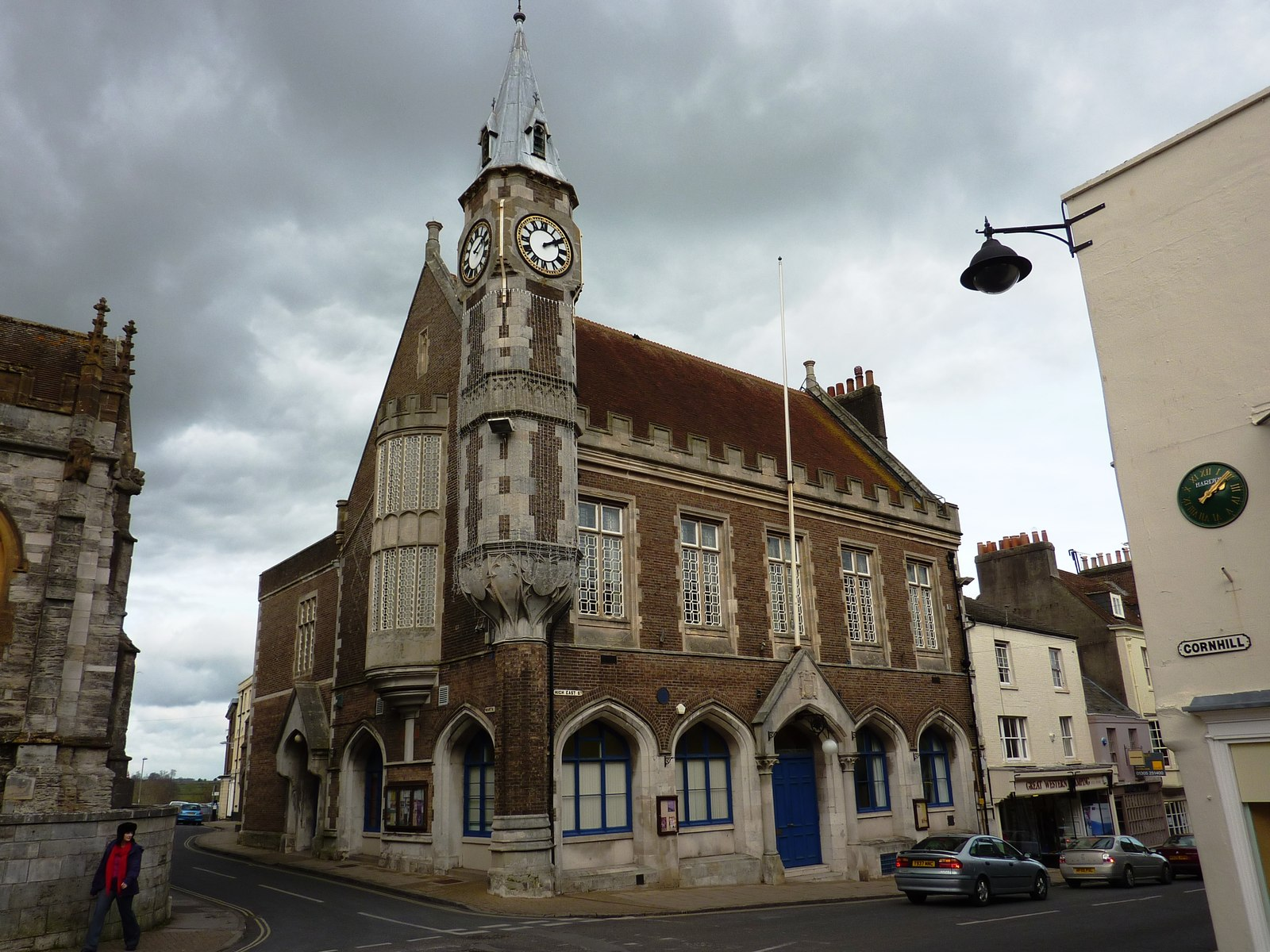
- Municipal Buildings

- Shown in Dorset
- 50.7156°N 2.4365°W
- Location: High East Street, Dorchester

History
- Built: 1848

Site notes
- Architect: Benjamin Ferrey
- Architectural style: Gothic Revival style

Listed Building – Grade II*
- Official name: Municipal Buildings
- Designated: 8 May 1975
- Reference no.: 1110585

The Municipal Buildings, also known as the Corn Exchange and Town Hall, are located on the north side of High East Street in Dorchester, Dorset, England. The structure, which incorporates the meeting place of Dorchester Town Council and an arts and community venue, is a Grade II* listed building.

== History ==
The first town hall in Dorchester, which was described as a "spacious and handsome edifice", was completed in 1791. It was arcaded on the ground floor, so that markets could be held, with an assembly room on the first floor. After Dorchester became a municipal borough in 1835, civic leaders decided to replace the old town hall with a new structure.

The new building was designed by Benjamin Ferrey in the Gothic Revival style, built by Samuel Slade in brown Broadmayne bricks with stone dressings and was completed in 1848. The design involved a symmetrical main frontage with five bays facing onto High East Street; the central bay featured a doorway with a fanlight flanked by Corinthian order columns supporting a triangular hood mould bearing the borough coat of arms; there were arched openings in the other bays on the ground floor and there were five mullion windows on the first floor. The roofline on the main frontage was crenelated. The North Square elevation featured a prominent two-storey oriel window which was also crenelated. A clock turret with a spire was attached at the southwest corner in 1864, containing a chiming clock by J. Moore & Sons of Clerkenwell. Internally, a corn exchange was established on the ground floor while a town hall and a council chamber were accommodated on the first floor. Pevsner described the building as the "visual climax" to views along the High Streets.

After a fall in price of English corn as a result of cheap imports in the 1870s, the openings on the ground floor were filled in with windows and the former corn exchange was subsequently used as an events venue: the novelist, Thomas Hardy, attended a rehearsal of his play, The Famous Tragedy of the Queen of Cornwall at Tintagel in Lyonnesse, which was performed by the Hardy Players, there in summer 1923. Concert performers included the contralto singer, Kathleen Ferrier, who made an appearance on 15 May 1951.

The municipal buildings remained the meeting place of Dorchester Borough Council for much of the 20th century, supplemented by nearby offices on North Square. It ceased to be the local seat of government when the enlarged West Dorset District Council was established at council offices in High West Street in 1974. Instead, the municipal buildings and the nearby offices on North Square passed to the new Dorchester Town Council. The roof of the municipal buildings complex was completely replaced in spring 2021.

In March 2021 the Dorchester Town Council announced proposals for further improvement works including new offices for town council officers at the rear of the municipal buildings: the intention was that this would enable officers to relocate from their premises at 19 North Square. Following the completion of the works, which were estimated to cost £2 million, the building would re-open under the management of Dorchester Arts, an organisation supported by Arts Council England, in autumn 2021. Whilst the extension was under construction it was decided that the office extension would be used by Dorchester Arts too, and the council offices would remain at 19 North Square. Town council meetings continue to be held in the municipal buildings. The building is now generally branded as the Corn Exchange and Town Hall, including on signposts around the town and on the building itself.

== See also ==
- Grade II* listed buildings in West Dorset
