= Flagstones Enclosure =

Neolithic archaeological site in England

Flagstones
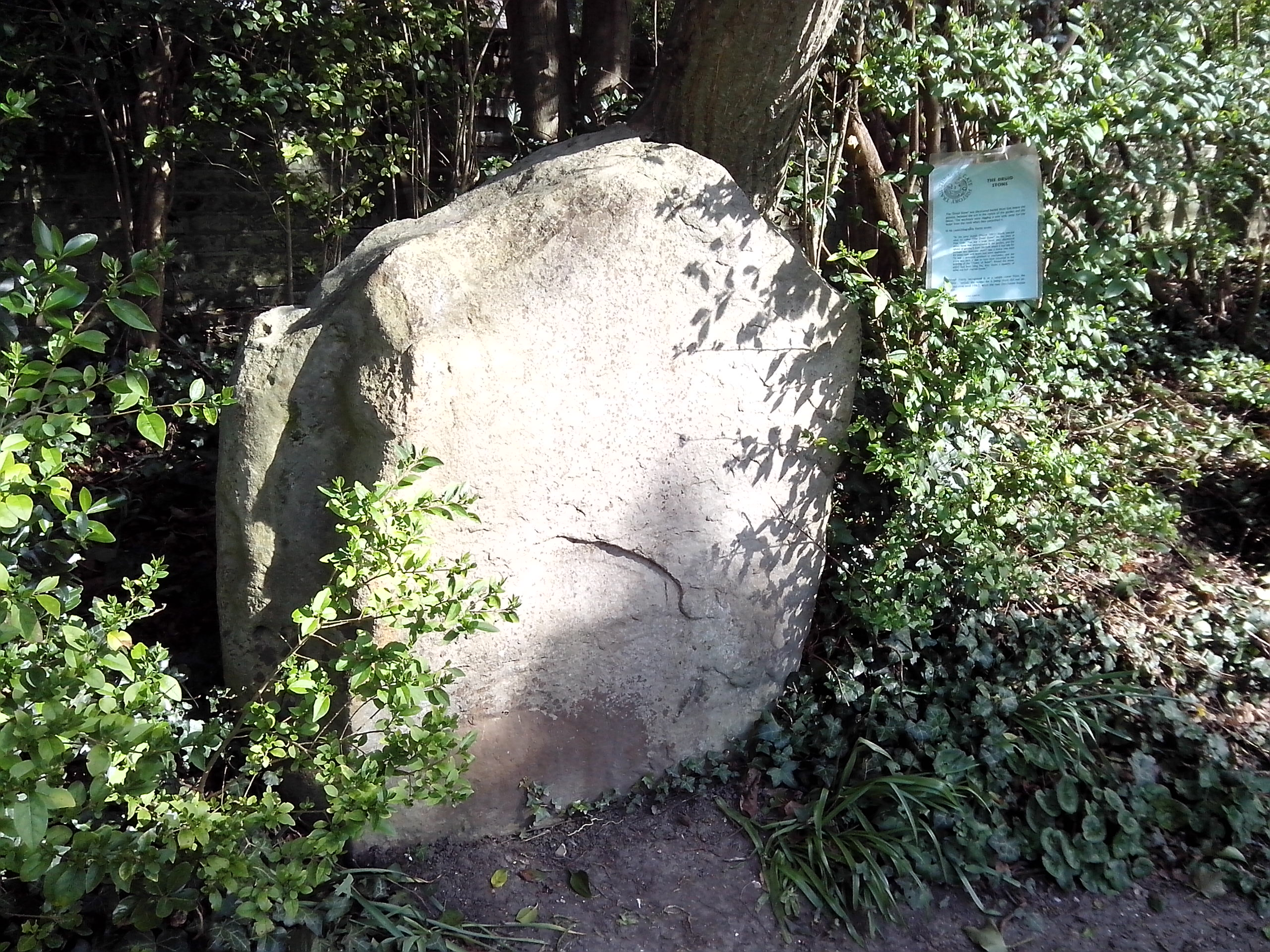
- The "Druid Stone" found at Thomas Hardy's house in 1891, now identified as a sarsen stone from Flagstones

- Location within Dorset
- 50.707°N 2.420°W
- Type: Causewayed enclosure
- Periods: Neolithic / Bronze Age
- Region: Dorset, England

Flagstones is a late Neolithic interrupted ditch enclosure (similar to a causewayed enclosure) on the outskirts of Dorchester, Dorset, England. It derives its name from having been discovered beneath the site of the demolished Flagstones House. Half of it was excavated in the 1980s when the Dorchester by-pass was built; the rest of it still exists under the grounds of Max Gate, author and architect Thomas Hardy's former house.

== The Druid Stone ==
In March 1891 workmen were digging under the lawn at Thomas Hardy's house at Max Gate when they discovered a large sarsen stone three feet (0.9 m) underground. It took seven men with levers to raise the stone which had been lying flat. Around the stone was a quantity of ashes and half-charred bones. Hardy called it "The Druid Stone" and had it erected at the edge of the lawn where it still stands; he wrote about the stone in his poem "The Shadow on the Stone". It was only when the enclosure was discovered in the 1980s that it was realised that the sarsen stone came from a larger monument.

== Excavations ==
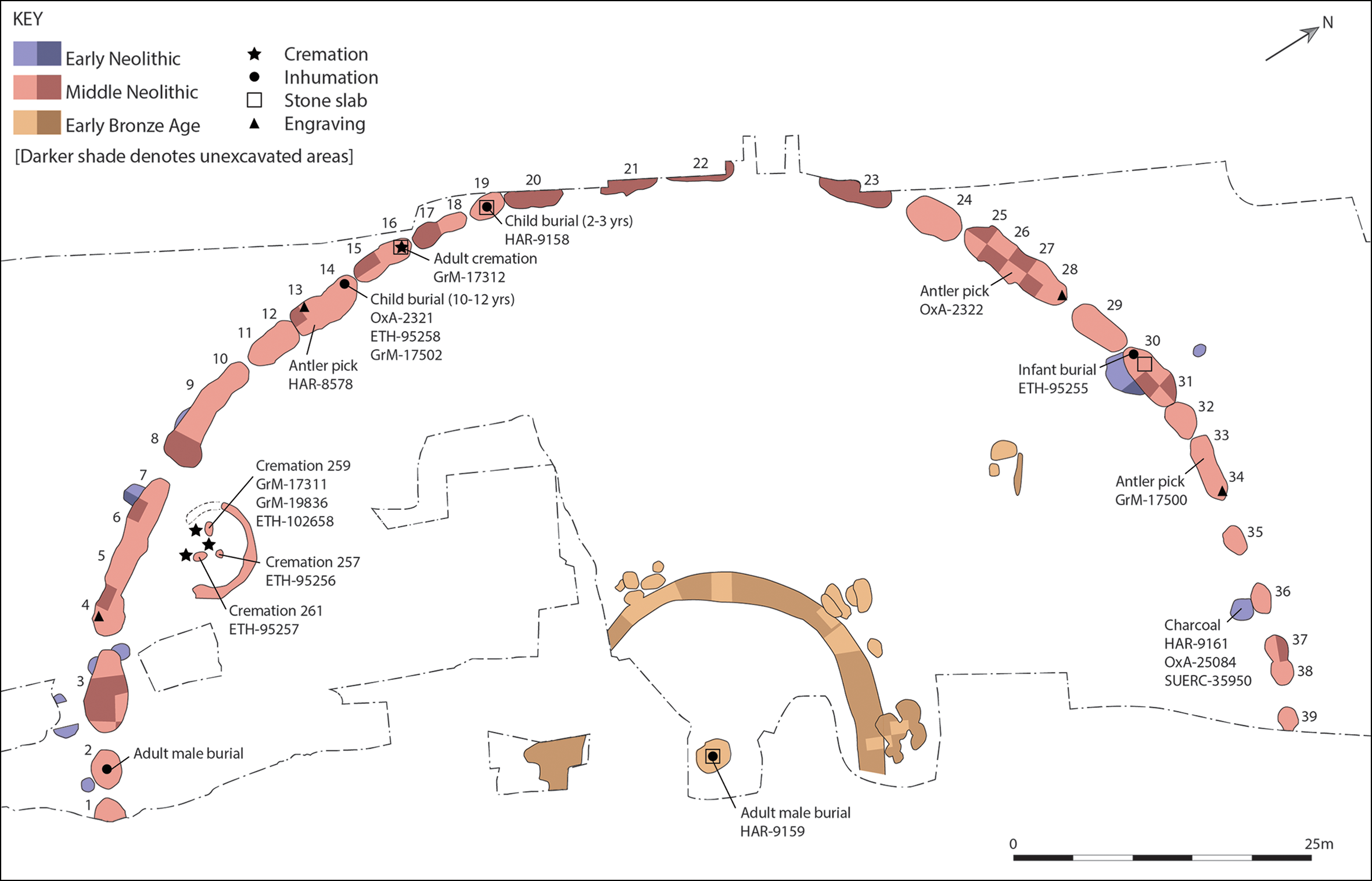
Excavation plan of the western half of the Neolithic Flagstones Enclosure

Around half of the enclosure was excavated in 1987. The part of the enclosure in the grounds of Flagstones House was excavated by Wessex Archaeology, and then the grounds were totally removed to make a deep cutting for the Dorchester by-pass road. The other half still exists under the grounds of Max Gate.

The enclosure comprised a circular ring of unevenly spaced pits constructed in the late 4th millennium BC. The chalk walls of some of the pit/ditch segments featured engraved designs, probably cut with flint. An adult cremation and two child inhumations were found at the bottom of ditch sections, each beneath a slab of sandstone or sarsen. A young man had been buried in a later Early Bronze Age tumulus in the centre of the enclosure. Carbon dating of the remains put the building of the enclosure at around 3486–2886 BC with the central burial dating to around a thousand years later. The central mound seems to have subsequently acted as a focus for much flint-knapping.

Mount Pleasant henge, a henge enclosure measuring 400 yd (370 m) along its long axis, lies around 500 metres to the east, and another henge Maumbury Rings, with a diameter of (85 m (279 ft), is about 1500 metres to the west.

In September 2024, the Flagstones enclosure was listed as a scheduled monument by the National Trust, and in April 2025, Time Team reported that new radiocarbon dates from the site are approximately three hundred years older than Stonehenge, raising questions about which monument came first.
