= Doles Ash =

Farm in Dorset, England

Coordinates: 50.80151°N 2.39579°W

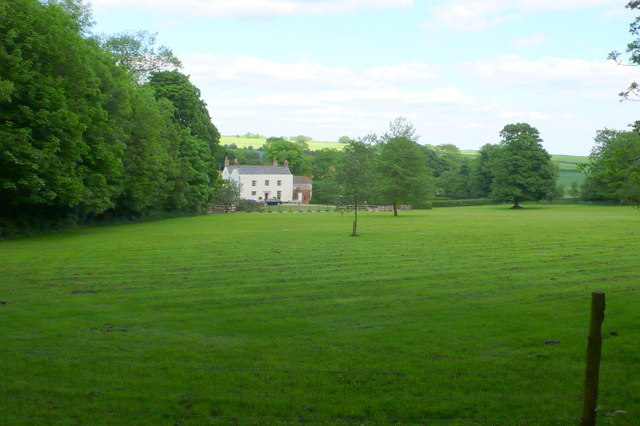
Doles Ash farmhouse

Doles Ash is a farm in Dorset, England, a few kilometres east of Piddletrenthide and south of Plush.

The farm features in Thomas Hardy's Tess of the d'Urbervilles as Flintcomb-Ash, the "starve-acre" farm where Tess goes to dig swedes with Marian.
