= Norrie Woodhall =

English actress (1905–2011)

- Born: Augusta Noreen Bugler; 18 December 1905; Dorchester
- Died: 25 October 2011 (aged 105)
- Resting place: Ashes scattered in the garden of 22 Moreton Road, Owermoigne
- Occupation: Actress
- Spouse: Frank Woodhall

Norrie Woodhall (née Bugler, 18 December 1905 – 25 October 2011) was an English actress who was the last surviving member of the Hardy Players, an amateur theatrical group based in Dorchester, Dorset, that formed in 1908 to perform dramatisations of the works of novelist Thomas Hardy.

== Biography ==
Acting

Augusta Noreen Bugler (“Gus” to her family, but "Norrie" more widely) was born in Dorchester in 1905, the youngest of four surviving children of Arthur Henry Bugler, a confectioner and baker, and Augusta Lydia Florence. Her parents ran the Central Temperance Hotel at 44 South Street in Dorchester; a plaque on the site of the hotel states that she was born there.

She attended Casterbridge School, a small private school in Dorchester, and then Beaminster Grammar School. She sat the Oxford Senior Examination in 1922 and passed with distinctions in History and French. These qualifications were not the basis for her career:

Norrie was born to act and as a young girl she loved to peep through a hole in the curtain to watch The Hardy Players rehearse in the dining room of her home [at the hotel]. As soon as she was old enough she joined them, and during the First World War, as part of a group called The Gypsies, would recite poems for the soldiers who were camping on Poundbury. Norrie was a natural actress, a talent which certainly did not diminish over her long life.

In 1924, at age 18, she played the part of Liza-Lu, Tess Durbeyfield’s sister, in Tess of the d'Urbervilles at the Corn Exchange in Dorchester. She was cast in the role by Hardy himself.

The BBC's tribute noted that "Norrie Woodhall was among a handful of Dorset actors who performed plays based on the author's works in 1924, rehearsing at Hardy's home at Max Gate." The Players were disbanded in 1928, the year of Hardy's death. In 2005, in response to a 100th birthday wish for Norrie, the New Hardy Players were formed. She was later their president. At her death Norrie was "the last of The Hardy Players".

Farming

In the early 1930s, Norrie's mother became ill with peritonitis and was rushed into hospital. She recovered, but the family retired from their business at the hotel, and moved to a house in Crossways, a village 6 miles to the east of Dorchester. Norrie became interested in raising poultry. The family bought Sunnybrook Poultry Farm in Owermoigne, and Norrie invested in some white Wyandottes; they later won a Gold Medal at the Dorset Laying Trials. She joined the Women's Land Army as a full-time poultry farmer from 1938 until the end of 1942. Her mother died of cancer during that time, on 6 March 1940; she is believed to have inspired the character Tess of the D'Urbervilles.

Early in the war years Norrie became interested in beekeeping. A nearby friend helped her set up a hive and she developed a new skill which grew over the years, ending up with ten hives. But one day she was badly bitten and nearly died. Her doctor advised her to give up beekeeping, which she did. She changed her poultry activities from free-range hens to egg production. She had many happy customers over quite an area, including one couple, Sarah and Frank Woodhall, who came from Weymouth. After Sarah had died of cancer in 1943, Frank Woodhall helped Norrie with the poultry.

== Personal life ==
Norrie Bugler married Frank Woodhall, eight years her senior, in 1962 at Weymouth Registry Office. "Both were passionate about history and heritage and spent much time visiting National Trust properties and gardens across the country". He died in 1988. She described the 25 years they were married as the happiest of her life.

A supplement to her 2006 biography, Norrie’s Second Century, was published in 2010.

In 2010, it was revealed that a collection of Hardy’s original manuscripts was to be sold at a charity auction. Woodhall and the New Hardy Players, supported by institutions such as the University of Exeter and the Dorset County Museum, launched a campaign to raise £58,000 to buy the collection. The campaign was successful, and the papers are now in the Dorset Museum.

Norrie Woodhall died on 25 October 2011. Her will stated that "I wish to be cremated after a short non-religious service and my ashes to be scattered in the garden of 22 Moreton Road, Owermoigne." A memorial service was held at Dorchester United Church on 21 November 2011, at which Lord Julian Fellowes addressed the large gathering. A year earlier he had interviewed Norrie in Thomas Hardy's study at the Dorset Museum & Art Gallery.
