= Emma Gifford =

English writer and suffragist

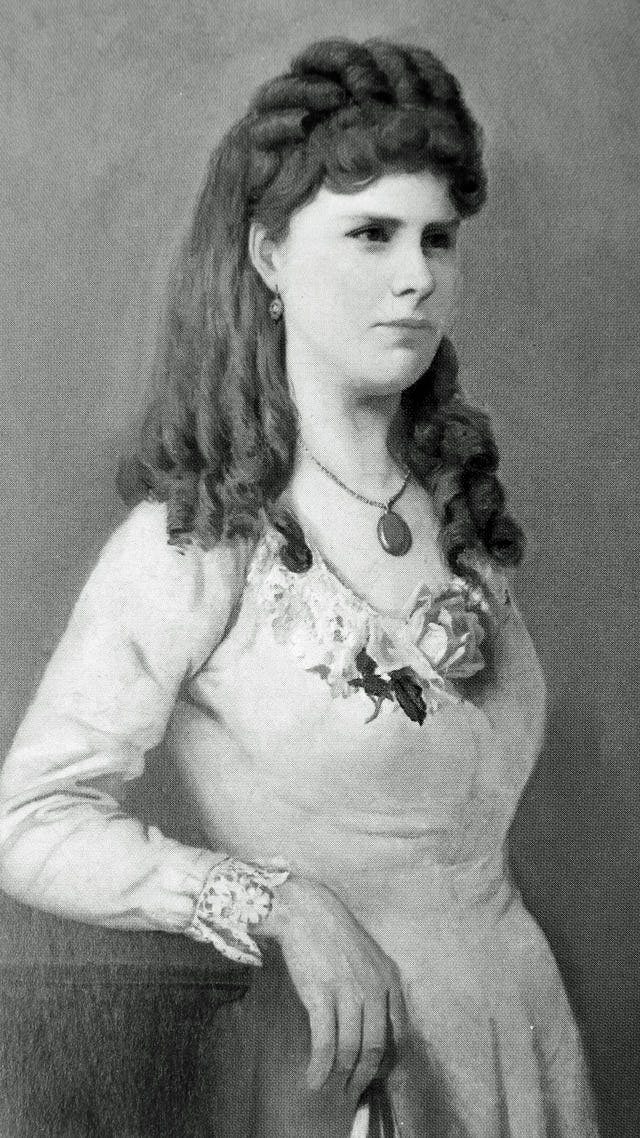
- Emma Gifford aged 25
- Born: Emma Lavinia Gifford; 24 November 1840; Plymouth, Devon, England
- Died: 27 November 1912 (aged 72); Dorchester, Dorset, England
- Spouse: Thomas Hardy (m. 1874)

Emma Lavinia Gifford (24 November 1840 – 27 November 1912) was an English writer and suffragist. She was also the first wife of the novelist and poet Thomas Hardy.

== Early life ==
Emma Gifford was born in Plymouth, Devon, on 24 November 1840 The second youngest of five children, her father was John Attersoll Gifford, a solicitor, and she was named after her mother, Emma (Farman) Gifford. Emma's father retired early and relied on his mother's private income, so when her grandmother died in 1860, the family had to make economies and moved to a cheaper, rented house in Bodmin, Cornwall. Emma and her elder sister Helen had to work as governesses, and Helen became an unpaid companion to a woman in whose home she met her husband, the Reverend Caddell Holder. Emma joined her in 1868 to help with housekeeping and to run the parish.

== Marriage ==
Emma Gifford met the writer Thomas Hardy in 1870 when he was working as an architect. Hardy had been commissioned to prepare a report on the condition of St Julitta's, the parish church of St Juliot, near Boscastle in Cornwall. Their courtship inspired A Pair of Blue Eyes, Hardy's third novel. They did not marry until four years later, on 17 September 1874, at St Peter's Church, Paddington, London. The ceremony was conducted by Emma's uncle, Edwin Hamilton Gifford, canon of Worcester Cathedral and later archdeacon of London. The Hardys had a honeymoon in Rouen and Paris. Given Thomas Hardy's comparatively humble origins, Emma "regarded herself as her husband's social superior, and in later life would make embarrassing references in public to the gap in class that existed between them".

== Later life ==
The Hardys were never able to have children, which may have affected their relationship. It was observed that the couple did not get on with each other; A. C. Benson noted, "It gave me a sense of something intolerable the thought of his having to live day and night with the absurd, inconsequent, huffy, rambling old lady. They don't get on together at all. The marriage was thought a misalliance for her, when he was poor and undistinguished, and she continues to resent it.... He (Hardy) is not agreeable to her either, but his patience must be incredibly tried. She is so queer, and yet has to be treated as rational, while she is full, I imagine, of suspicions and jealousies and affronts which must be half insane."

A frequent visitor to the household, Evelyn Evans, said Emma Hardy "was considered very odd by the townspeople of Dorchester.... Her delusions of grandeur grew more marked. Never forgetting that she was an archdeacon's niece who had married beneath her ... she persuaded embarrassed editors to publish her worthless poems, and intimated that she was the guiding spirit of all Hardy's work"; Christine Wood Homer, a friend of the Hardys, said Emma "had the fixed idea that she was the superior of her husband in birth, education, talents, and manners. She could not, and never did, recognise his greatness.... Whereas at first she had only been childish, with advancing age she became very queer and talked curiously."

After twenty years of marriage, Thomas Hardy published Jude the Obscure, controversial for its portrayal of Victorian religion, sexual mores and marriage. Emma disapproved of Hardy's last novel because of the book's criticisms of religion and because she worried that the reading public would believe the relationship between Jude and Sue paralleled her strained relationship with Hardy. Emma and Hardy spent more and more time apart, and he began seeing other women, such as Florence Dugdale, companion to Lady Stoker, sister-in-law of Bram Stoker, author of Dracula. Hardy portrays Florence in various poems such as "On the Departure Platform". In 1899, Emma became a virtual recluse and spent much of her time in attic rooms, which she asked Thomas Hardy to build for her and were what she called "my sweet refuge and solace".

== Women's suffrage ==
An active suffragist and supporter of women's suffrage, Emma wrote much about women's rights and the suffrage movement. In November 1899, Emma put her name in a copy of Mary Wollstonecraft's A Vindication of the Rights of Women. In a letter to her friend, Rebekah Owen, she writes, "...Supposing women had always held the reins of this world would it not have been by now, getting near the goal of happiness? This is a man's world - & in spite of their intellect shown most especially in science! It is in fact a terrible failure as to peace & joy...". In February 1907, Emma joined George Bernard Shaw and his wife in a march in London.

Emma was also an active member of the London Society for Women's Suffrage, contributing alongside Millicent Fawcett and Annie Kenney to a symposium on the suffrage issue published in March 1907 by the Woman at Home magazine. In March 1908, she published a long letter in The Nation magazine, arguing for women's rights. She wrote:

"Women have been sacrificed for ages to men. The absurd idea kept up by them, and hitherto humbly accepted by women, that their manhood is a much higher state for a human being than a woman’s womanhood, is allied with tyranny and a fearful calculation as to the real capabilities of women, who are abashed and crushed by their treatment, and obliged hitherto to cringe to the idea of the superiority of the male, whose praise has seldom been for a good woman except safely on a tombstone."

Emma eventually stepped down from activities in the movement due to her disagreement over acts of violence committed by more militant suffragettes. She would, however, continue to send modest donations towards the cause.

== Death ==
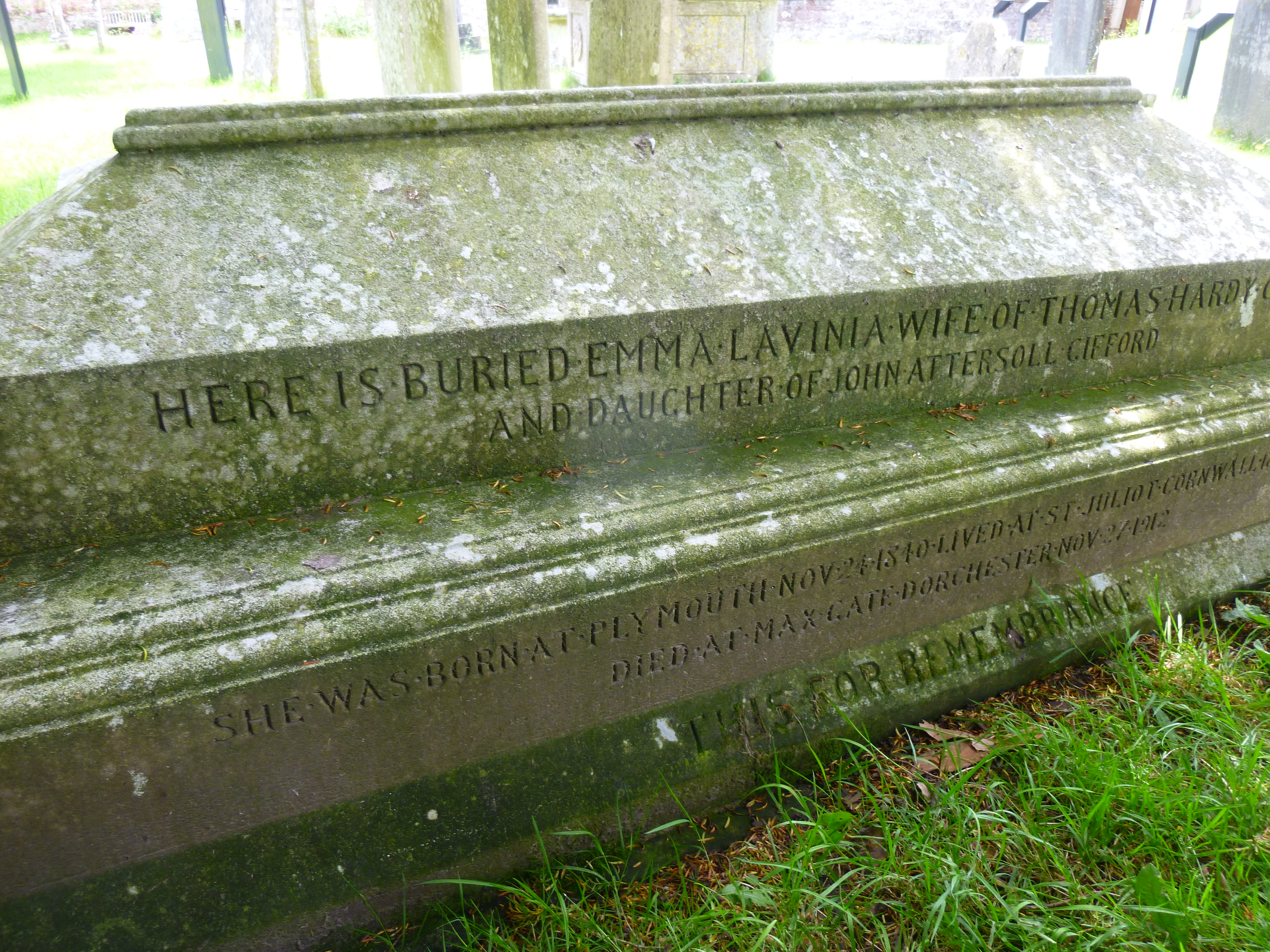
Grave of Emma Gifford Hardy at St Michael's, Stinsford, Dorset

Emma Hardy died at Max Gate, the house she shared with Hardy near Dorchester on 27 November 1912, at the age of 72. On 26 November, she had felt unwell and allowed a doctor to visit but not to examine her. At 8 a.m. on 27 November, her maid found her "moaning and terribly ill". The maid summoned the cook, who attempted to carry her down the staircase, but by the time Hardy had been called, he found her unconscious, and she died shortly afterwards. The doctor gave the cause of death as heart failure and impacted gallstones. She was buried three days later at the church of St Michael, Stinsford, Dorset. Thomas Hardy had a wreath inscribed "From her lonely husband, with the Old Affection."

Satires of Circumstance, Thomas Hardy's fourth book of verse, includes The Poems of 1912–13, a collection of poems written immediately following Emma's death. Hardy found a notebook titled "What I Think of My Husband" in her attic bedroom and spent the rest of his life regretting the unhappiness he had caused her.

== Some Recollections, and other writings ==
Emma was an occasional writer throughout her life, working for example on her unpublished short story "The Maid on the Shore" during her engagement to Hardy. In later life, she wrote what Ford Madox Ford described as "her own innocuous poems", such as "The Trumpet Call (to the single Daffodil)" [1910] as well as prose poems which she published privately as Spaces in 1912.

After Emma's death, Thomas Hardy discovered a book bound in brown paper, made from the pages of exercise books and stitched together with red thread. The title was Some Recollections by E. L. Hardy and the last page was headed 4 January 1911. The manuscript covered her early life, up to the time of her marriage. Thomas Hardy included part of it in his autobiography The Early Life of Thomas Hardy, in pages 88–96. The whole of it was edited by Evelyn Hardy and Robert Gittings and published with "some relevant poems by Thomas Hardy" in 1961; a revised edition was published in 1979.

Recollections makes plain Emma Gifford's early zest for life, and her enjoyment of what it had to offer: musical evenings with her family; parties and balls, with "Splendid sashes and stockings and shoes...and very graceful and light and airy we all looked in them"; horse-riding on her mare Fanny, "scampering up and down the hills on my beloved mare...my hair floating on the wind"; and the Cornish scenery, "with its magnificent waves and spray, its white gulls and black choughs and grey puffins, its cliffs and rocks and gorgeous sunsettings": All are recalled with a bright and lively tone, on which Hardy drew decades later when he immortalised her in his Poems 1912–13.
