= Tess of the d'Urbervilles =

1891 novel by Thomas Hardy

Tess of the d'Urbervilles: A Pure Woman
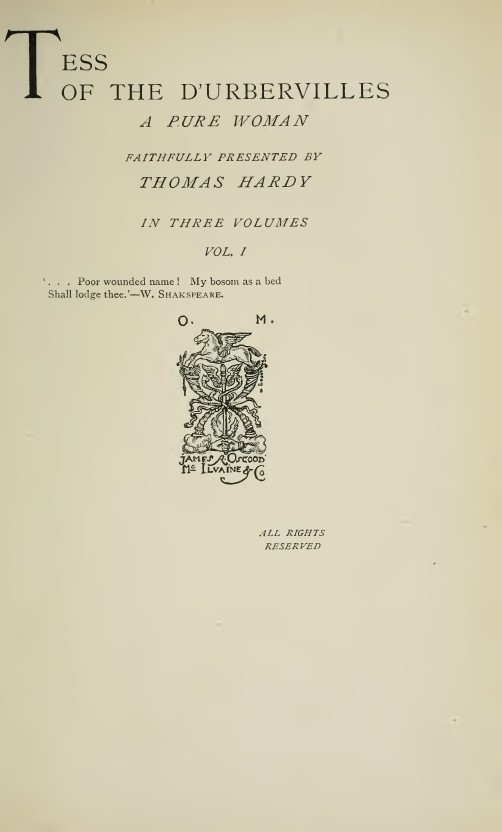
- Title page of first edition
- Author: Thomas Hardy
- Language: English
- Genre: Social novel Tragedy
- Set in: Thomas Hardy's Wessex, 1870s
- Published: 1891
- Publisher: James R. Osgood, McIlvaine & Co.
- Publication place: United Kingdom
- Pages: 592
- Dewey Decimal: 823.89
- LC Class: PR4748.A2 D65
- Text: Tess of the d'Urbervilles: A Pure Woman at Wikisource

Tess of the d'Urbervilles: A Pure Woman is the twelfth published novel by English author Thomas Hardy. It initially appeared in a censored and serialised version, published by the British illustrated newspaper The Graphic in 1891, then in book form in three volumes in 1891, and as a single volume in 1892. Although now considered a major novel of the 19th century, Tess of the d'Urbervilles received mixed reviews when it first appeared, in part because it challenged the morals of late Victorian England.

The novel is set in an impoverished rural England, Thomas Hardy's fictional Wessex.

== Plot summary ==
=== The Maiden ===
Tess Durbeyfield, a country girl of 16, is the eldest child of John Durbeyfield, a haggler, and his wife Joan. When the local parson tells John that "Durbeyfield" is a corruption of "D'Urberville" and that he is descended from an ancient Norman family, John celebrates by getting drunk. Tess drives to market in her father's place, but falls asleep at the reins; the wagon crashes and the family's only horse is killed. Feeling guilty, she agrees to visit Mrs d'Urberville, a rich widow, to "claim kin", unaware that the widow's late husband Simon Stoke had adopted the surname to distance himself from his tradesman's roots.

Alec d'Urberville, the son, is attracted to Tess and finds her a job as his mother's poultry keeper. Tess resists Alec's manipulative attentions. One night, on the pretence of rescuing her from a fight, Alec takes her on his horse to a remote spot, and it is implied that he rapes her.

=== Maiden No More ===
The following summer, Tess gives birth to a sickly boy. Unable to find a parson prepared to christen a child born out of wedlock, Tess attempts to do it herself, naming her dying child Sorrow.

=== The Rally ===
Some years later, Tess finds employment as a milkmaid at Talbothays Dairy, where her past is unknown. She falls in love with Angel Clare, an apprentice gentleman farmer who is studying dairy management.

=== The Consequence ===
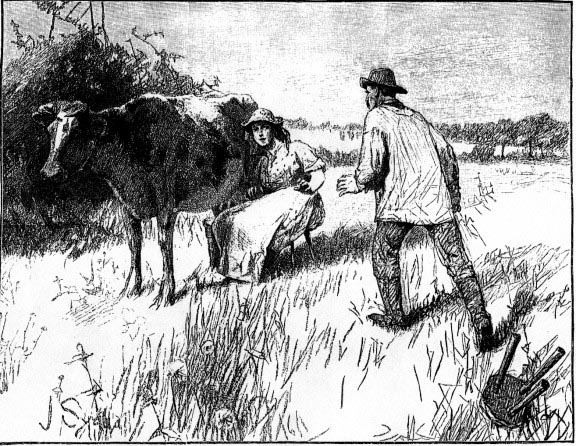
"He jumped up from his seat... and went quickly toward the desire of his eyes." 1891 illustration by Joseph Syddall

Angel's father, James Clare, a clergyman, is surprised that his son wishes to marry a milkmaid but makes no objection, understanding Tess to be a pure and devout country maiden.

Feeling she has no choice but to conceal her past, Tess is reluctant to accept Angel's marriage proposal, but eventually agrees. She later tries several times to tell Angel of her history, but he says that they can share confidences after the wedding.

The couple spend their wedding night at an old d'Urberville mansion. When Angel confesses that he once had a brief affair with an older woman, Tess tells him about Alec, sure now he will understand and forgive.

=== The Woman Pays ===
Angel is appalled. Tess is not the pure maiden he took her for, and although he concedes she was "more sinned against" than sinning, he feels that her "want of firmness" amounts to a character flaw. The couple separate after a few days. Tess returns home while Angel travels to Brazil to try farming there.

Tess's family soon exhaust the funds Angel has given her, and she is forced to take field work at the starve-acre farm of Flintcomb-Ash.

=== The Convert ===
Alec d'Urberville continues to pursue Tess although she is already married. When Tess learns from her younger sister 'Liza-Lu that her parents are ill, she rushes home. Her mother recovers but her father dies, and the destitute family is evicted from their home. Alec tells Tess that her husband will never return, and he offers to house the Durbeyfields on his estate. She refuses.

Angel's farming venture fails, he repents of his treatment of Tess, and he decides to return to England.

=== Fulfilment ===
After a long search, Angel finds Tess elegantly dressed and living in a boarding house in the fashionable seaside resort of Sandbourne, under the name of "Mrs d'Urberville". In anguish, Tess tells him he has arrived too late. Angel reluctantly leaves.

Tess and Alec argue, and Tess leaves the house. Sitting in her parlour beneath the d'Urbervilles' rented rooms, the landlady notices a spreading red spot – a bloodstain – on the ceiling. Tess has stabbed Alec to death in his bed.

Tess chases after Angel and tells him of the deed. The couple find an empty house and stay there for five days in blissful, loving seclusion before being forced to move to evade capture. In the night, they stumble upon Stonehenge. Tess asks Angel to marry and look after 'Liza-Lu when she is gone. She sleeps on an ancient stone altar. At dawn, while Tess sleeps, Angel sees they are surrounded. Tess's final words on waking are "I am ready."

Angel and 'Liza-Lu look down at 8 a.m. from a nearby hill over the town of Wintoncester as a black flag that signals Tess's execution is raised over the prison. Angel and 'Liza-Lu go on their way hand in hand.

== Principal characters ==
- Tess Durbeyfield, the novel's protagonist, a country girl
- John and Joan Durbeyfield, Tess's parents
- Eliza Louisa ('Liza-Lu) Durbeyfield, the eldest of Tess's younger siblings
- Angel Clare, intending farmer who becomes Tess's husband
- Alec Stoke-d’Urberville, Tess's seducer/rapist and father of her child
- Mrs d’Urberville (Stoke-d’Urberville), Alec's mother
- Marian, Izz Huett and Retty Priddle, milkmaids, friends of Tess
- Reverend and Mrs Clare, Angel's parents
- Reverends Felix and Cuthbert Clare, Angel's brothers
- Mercy Chant, schoolteacher whom Angel's family initially hopes he will marry

== Symbolism ==
=== Themes ===
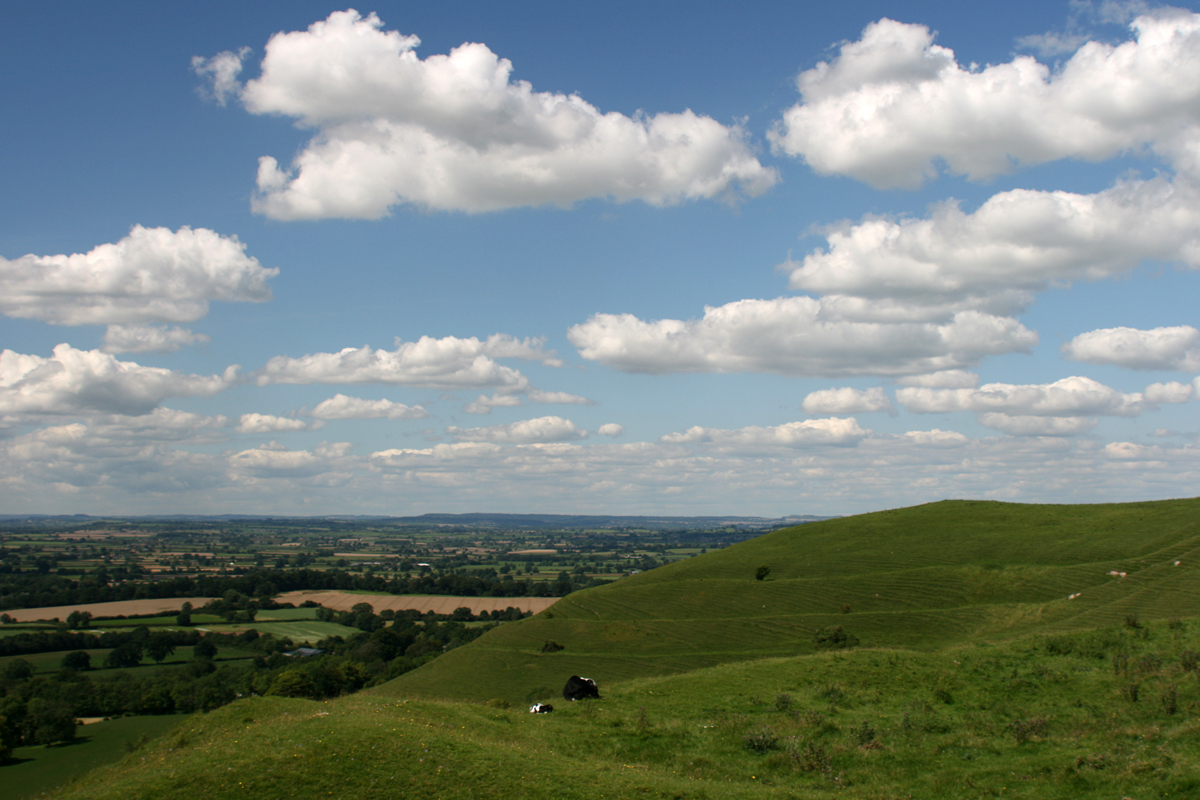
The Vale of Blackmore, the main setting for Tess. Hambledon Hill towards Stourton Tower

Hardy's writing often explores what he called the "ache of modernism", a theme notable in Tess, which as one critic noted, Hardy draws on imagery associated with hell to describe modern farm machinery and suggests the effete nature of city life as milk sent there must be watered down before townspeople can stomach it.

On the other hand, the Marxist critic Raymond Williams in The English Novel from Dickens to Lawrence questions the identification of Tess with a peasantry destroyed by industrialization. Williams sees Tess not as a peasant, but as an educated member of the rural working class, who suffers a tragedy through being thwarted in her hopes to rise socially and desire for a good life (which includes love and sex), not by industrialism, but by the landed bourgeoisie (Alec), liberal idealism (Angel) and Christian moralism in her family's village. Earlier commentators were not always appreciative. Henry James and Robert Louis Stevenson in Bournemouth "loved to talk of books and bookmen". Stevenson, unlike James, was an admirer of Thomas Hardy, but wrote to James expressing his violent reaction to Tess of the D'Urbervilles; James wrote back agreeing the book was 'vile' (not a word used by Stevenson).

=== References, personification, character, experiences ===
Because of the numerous pagan and neo-Biblical references made about her, Tess has been seen variously as an Earth goddess or a sacrificial victim.

Tess has been seen as a personification of nature, an idea supported by her ties with animals throughout the novel. Tess's misfortunes begin when she falls asleep while driving Prince to market and causes the horse's death; at Trantridge she becomes a poultry-keeper; she and Angel fall in love amid cows in the fertile Froom valley; on the road to Flintcomb-Ash, she kills some wounded pheasants to end their suffering.

However, Tess emerges as a powerful character not through this symbolism but because "Hardy's feelings for her were strong, perhaps stronger than for any of his other invented personages."

When Hardy was 16, he saw the hanging of Elizabeth Martha Brown, who had murdered a violent husband. This fascinating, yet repellent experience contributed to the writing of Tess.

=== Morality and society ===
The moral commentary running through the novel insists that Tess is not at fault, instead imposing mythological, biblical and folk imagery on a story of a young girl seduced and abandoned to create a "challenging contemporaneity". It was controversial and polarizing, setting these elements in a context of 19th-century English society, including disputes in the Church, the National School movement, the overall class structure of English society, and changing circumstances of rural labour. During the era of first-wave feminism, civil divorce was introduced and campaigns were waged against child prostitution, moving gender and sexuality issues to the forefront of public discussion. Hardy's work was criticized as vulgar, but by the late 19th century other experimental fiction works were released such as Florence Dixie's depiction of feminist utopia, The Story of an African Farm by Olive Schreiner, and Sarah Grand's work The Heavenly Twins. These raised awareness of syphilis and advocated sensitivity rather than condemnation for young women infected with it.

=== Rape/seduction ===
Hardy's description leaves it unclear whether Alec d’Urberville rapes Tess or whether he seduces her, and the issue has been the subject of debate.

Mary Jacobus, a commentator on Hardy's works, speculates that the rape/seduction ambiguity may have been forced on the author to meet publisher requirements and the "Grundyist" readership of his time.

== Adaptations ==
=== Theatre ===
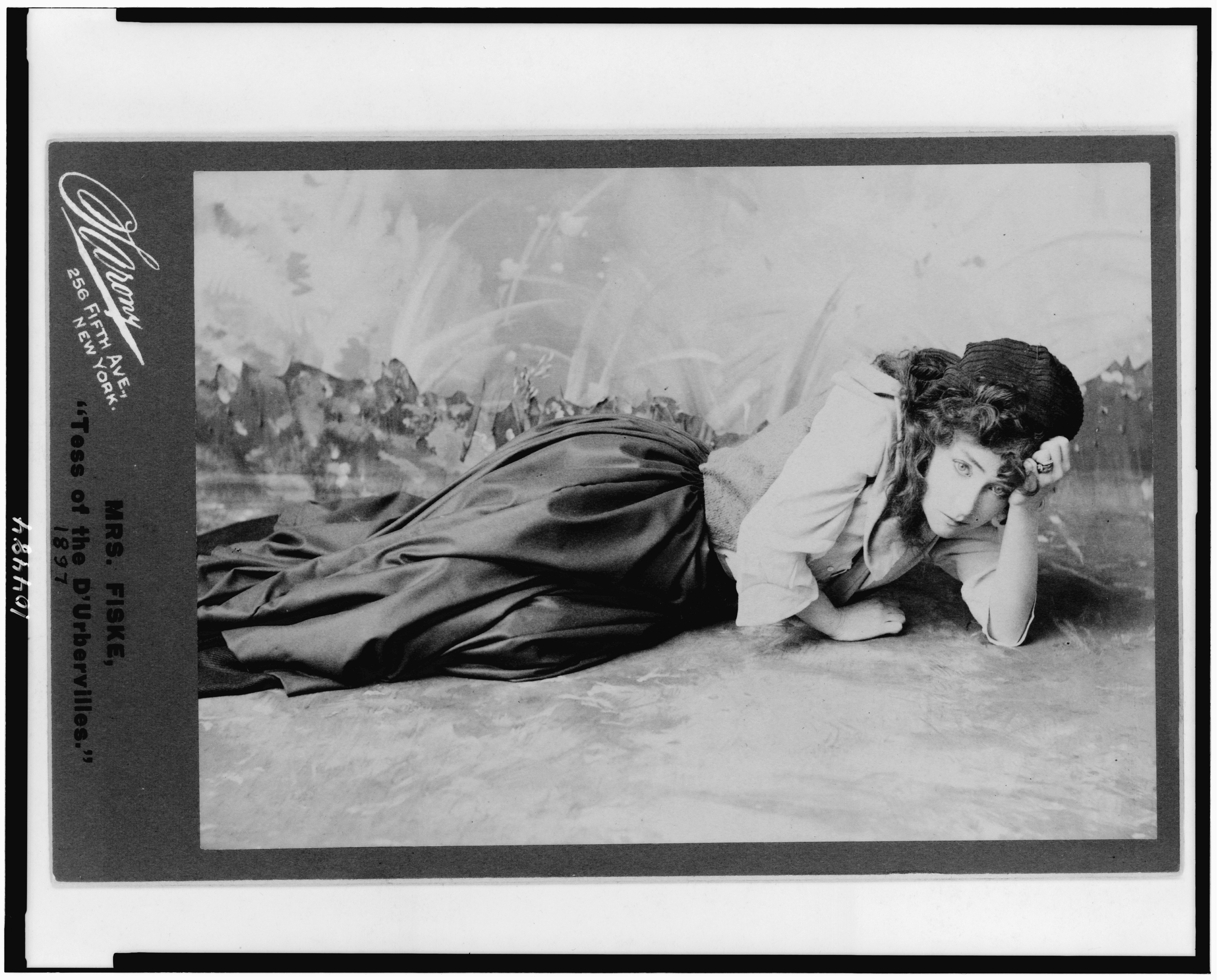
Mrs. Fiske in Lorimer Stoddard's stage adaptation of Tess of the d'Urbervilles (1897)

The novel was adapted for the stage in 1897. The production by Lorimer Stoddard proved a Broadway triumph for actress Minnie Maddern Fiske when it opened on 2 March 1897. A copyright performance was given at St James's Theatre in London on the same date. It was revived in America in 1902 and then made into a motion picture by Adolph Zukor in 1913, starring Mrs. Fiske; no copies remain.

In the UK, an adaptation, Tess, by H. Mountford, opened at the Grand Theatre in Blackpool on 5 January 1900.

Tess, a different stage adaptation by H. A. Kennedy, premièred at the Coronet Theatre in London's Notting Hill Gate on 19 February 1900. Mrs Lewis Waller (Florence West) played the title role, with William Kettridge as Angel Clare and Whitworth Jones as Alec Tantridge. The play transferred to the Comedy Theatre for 17 performances from 14 April 1900 with a slightly different cast, including Fred Terry as Alec and Oswald Yorke as Angel. Hardy wrote to the Times stating that he had played no part in the dramatisation, did not authorise its production and did not know how the play unfolded, other than by what he had read in the papers.

In 1924, Hardy wrote a British theatrical adaptation and chose Gertrude Bugler, a Dorchester girl from the original Hardy Players to play Tess. The Hardy Players (re-formed in 2005) was an amateur group from Dorchester that re-enacted Hardy's novels. Bugler was acclaimed, but prevented from taking the London stage part by the jealousy of Hardy's wife Florence; Hardy had said that young Gertrude was the true incarnation of the Tess he had imagined. Years before writing the novel, Hardy had been inspired by the beauty of her mother Augusta Way, then an 18-year-old milkmaid, when he visited Augusta's father's farm in Bockhampton. When Hardy saw Bugler (he rehearsed The Hardy Players at the hotel run by her parents), he immediately recognised her as a young image of the now older Augusta.

The novel was successfully adapted for the stage several more times:

- 1946: An adaptation by playwright Ronald Gow became a triumph on the West End starring Wendy Hiller.
- 1999: Tess of the d'Urbervilles, a new West End musical with music by Stephen Edwards and lyrics by Justin Fleming opens in London at the Savoy Theatre.
- 2007: Tess, The New Musical (a rock opera) with lyrics, music and libretto by Annie Pasqua and Jenna Pasqua premières in New York City.
- 2009: Tess of the d'Urbervilles, a new stage adaptation with five actors was produced in London by Myriad Theatre & Film.
- 2010: Tess, a new rock opera, is an official Next Link Selection at the New York Musical Theatre Festival with music, lyrics, and libretto by Annie Pasqua and Jenna Pasqua.
- 2011: Tess of the d'Urbervilles, adapted from the original 1924 script by Devina Symes for Norrie Woodhall, the last surviving member of Hardy’s theatrical group, the Hardy Players. Three extra scenes were included at Woodhall's request, including the final one, staged as Woodhall described it from her own appearance in Hardy's original adaptation: "Tess, accompanied by Angel Clare, is arrested by a phalanx of constables for the murder of her other suitor Alec d'Urberville at sunrise, after a night spent within the bluestone towers of a lonely henge on the bleak and wind swept expanse of Salisbury Plain."
- 2012: Tess of the d'Urbervilles was produced into a piece of musical theatre by Youth Music Theatre UK as part of their summer season, and further developed, edited and performed in 2017 at the Theatre Royal, Winchester, and The Other Palace, London in 2018.
- 2019: Tess – The Musical, a new British musical by composer Michael Blore and playwright Michael Davies, received a workshop production at The Other Place, the Royal Shakespeare Company's studio theatre in Stratford-upon-Avon, in February 2019.

=== Opera ===
1906: An Italian operatic version written by Frederic d'Erlanger was first performed in Naples, but the run was cut short by an eruption of Mount Vesuvius. When the opera came to London three years later, Hardy, then 69, attended the premiere.

=== Film, television and radio ===
The story has also been filmed at least eight times, including three for general release through cinemas and four television productions.

==== Cinema ====
  - 1913: The "lost" silent version, mentioned under Theatre, starring Minnie Maddern Fiske as Tess and Scots-born David Torrence as Alec.
  - 1924: Another lost silent version was made with Blanche Sweet (Tess), Stuart Holmes (Alec), and Conrad Nagel (Angel).
  - 1944: Man Ki Jeet, Indian Hindi-language film adaptation directed by W. Z. Ahmed.
  - 1967: Dulhan Ek Raat Ki, Indian Hindi-language film starring Nutan, Dharmendra and Rehman.
  - 1979: Roman Polanski's film Tess with Nastassja Kinski (Tess), Leigh Lawson (Alec), and Peter Firth (Angel).
  - 1996: Prem Granth, Indian Hindi-language film adaptation directed by Rajiv Kapoor - starring Rishi Kapoor and Madhuri Dixit in the lead roles.
  - 2000: Nishiddha Nodi is an Indian Assamese-language film by Bidyut Chakrabarty, based on the novel, produced by the Assam State Film (Finance and Development) Corporation and released on 18 February 2000.
  - 2011: Michael Winterbottom 21st-century Indian set film Trishna with Freida Pinto and Riz Ahmed.

==== Television and radio ====
  - 1952: BBC TV, directed by Michael Henderson, and starring Barbara Jefford (Tess), Michael Aldridge (Alec), and Donald Eccles (Angel).
  - 1960: ITV, ITV Play of the Week, "Tess", directed by Michael Currer-Briggs, and starring Geraldine McEwan (Tess), Maurice Kaufmann (Alec), and Jeremy Brett (Angel).
  - 1998: London Weekend Television's three-hour mini-series Tess of the D'Urbervilles, directed by Ian Sharp, and starring Justine Waddell (Tess), Jason Flemyng (Alec), and Oliver Milburn (Angel), the latter Dorset-born.
  - 2008: A four-hour BBC adaptation, written by David Nicholls, aired in the United Kingdom in September and October 2008 in four parts, and in the United States on the PBS series Masterpiece Classic in January 2009 in two parts. The cast included Gemma Arterton (Tess), Hans Matheson (Alec), Eddie Redmayne (Angel), Ruth Jones (Joan), Anna Massey (Mrs d'Urberville), and Kenneth Cranham (Reverend James Clare).
  - 2020: The BBC Radio 4 series "Hardy's Women" featured a three-part adaptation of the novel from Tess's perspective.

==== Other ====
  - 2015: American heavy metal band Ice Nine Kills' Tess-Timony on their fourth album Every Trick in the Book is directly inspired by the book.
  - 2022: English rock band Half Man Half Biscuit's Tess Of The Dormobiles on their fifteenth album The Voltarol Years features many references to the book within the lyrics.

== Secondary sources ==
- William A. Davis Jr., "Hardy and the 'Deserted Wife' Question: The Failure of the Law in Tess of the D'urbervilles." Colby Quarterly 29.1 (1993): 5–19
- Pamela Gossin, Thomas Hardy's Novel Universe: Astronomy, Cosmology, and Gender in the Post-Darwinian World. Aldershot, England: Ashgate, 2007
- James A. W. Heffernan, "'Cruel Persuasion': Seduction, Temptation and Agency in Hardy's Tess." Thomas Hardy Yearbook 35 (2005): 5–18
- L. R. Leavis, "Marriage, Murder, and Morality: The Secret Agent and Tess." Neophilologus 80.1 (1996): 161–69
- Oliver Lovesey, "Reconstructing Tess." SEL: Studies in English Literature 1500–1900 43.4 (2003): 913–38
- Adrian Poole, "'Men's Words' and Hardy's Women." Essays in Criticism: A Quarterly Journal of Literary Criticism 31.4 (1981): 328–345
