= Florence Dugdale =

English writer and the second wife of the poet Thomas Hardy

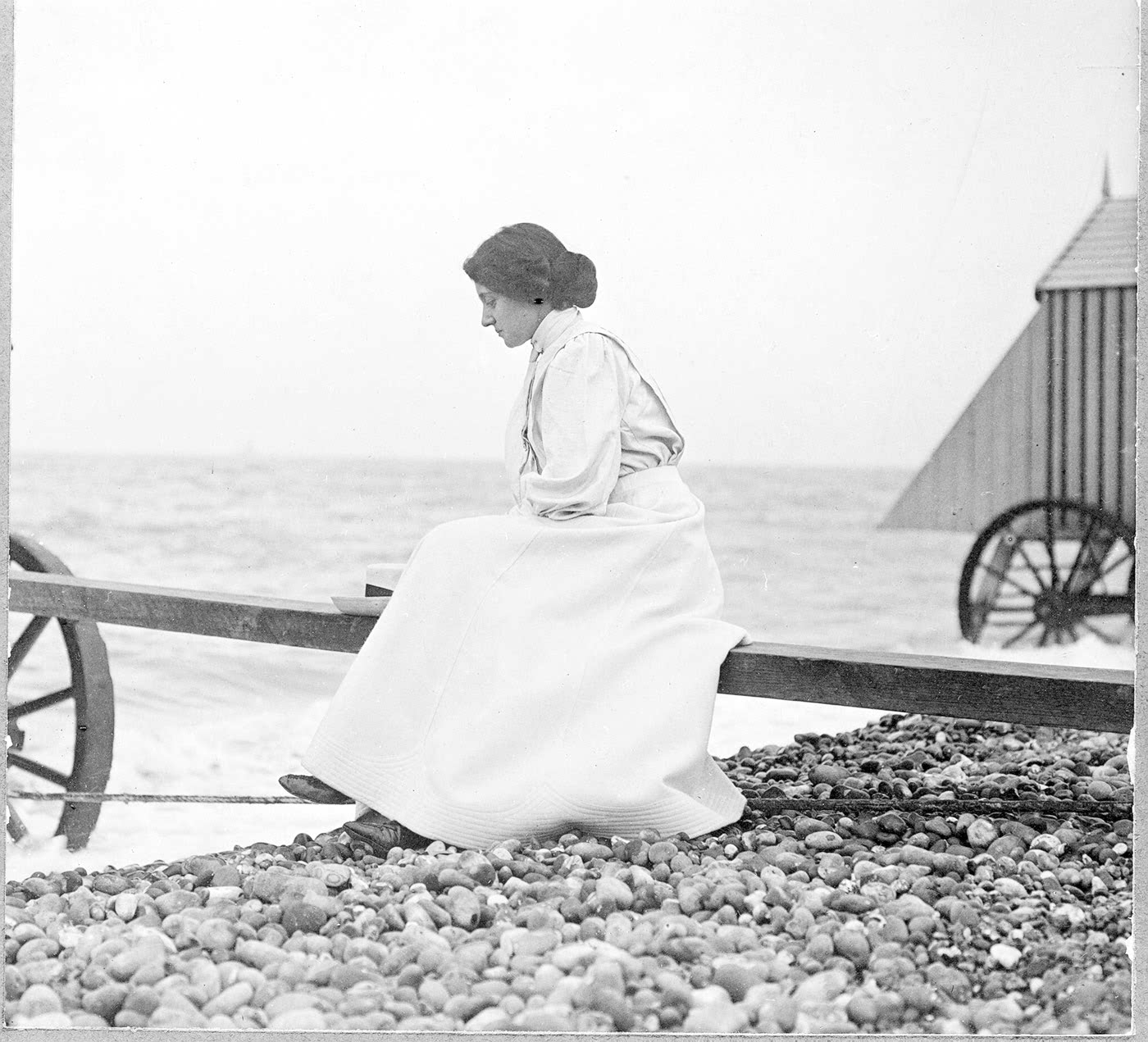
- Dugdale in 1915
- Born: 12 January 1879; Edmonton, Middlesex, England, UKGBI
- Died: 17 October 1937 (aged 58); Dorchester, Dorset, England, UK
- Occupations: Journalist; writer; teacher
- Spouse: Thomas Hardy (m. 1914; died 1928)

Florence Emily Dugdale (married name Hardy; 12 January 1879 – 17 October 1937) was an English journalist, children's short-story writer and teacher. Dugdale was the second wife of the novelist and poet Thomas Hardy, and acted as Hardy's typist in his later years.

== Early life and education ==
Dugdale was born on 12 January 1879 in Edmonton, Middlesex (present-day London Borough of Enfield) to Edward Dugdale, a schoolmaster at St Andrew's National School for Boys in Enfield, and Emma Dugdale, a former governess. Dugdale was the second eldest of 5 siblings.

Dugdale first attended a National school for girls in St. Andrew's parish, before studying at Higher Grade School between the ages of 12 and 15.

In 1894, at the age of 15, Dugdale became a pupil-teacher at St Andrew's National School for Girls alongside her older sister Ethel. In March 1897, Dugdale resigned from St Andrew's National School for Girls and completed her statutory apprenticeship at another school in Enfield. Following her apprenticeship Dugdale applied to teacher training college but was refused admission for medical reasons. In January 1898, Dugdale began teaching at her father's school with the aim of gaining her teaching certificate within four years. Dugdale dealt with constant ill health, depression and chronic Laryngitis during this period, and didn't sit her Board of Education certificate examination until 1906. Dugdale passed with special credit in English literature, composition, and the principles of education.

== Career ==
In 1901, Dugdale delivered a paper on King Arthur at the Enfield Literary Union.

In the late 1800s Dugdale was a companion of Emily Stoker, the wife of Sir Thornley Stoker. Emily Stoker lived with some form of mental illness, and was cared for by Stoker's secretary. Dugdale provided periodic respite care at the Stoker's Dublin home during 1906–1908.

Dugdale first met Thomas Hardy in 1905 when she was age 26. She became his passionate friend and helper, and stopped teaching in 1908; both to assist Hardy and to begin her writing career. In 1912, she published her first book, The Book of Baby Birds, with Hardy's contribution. In the same year, Hardy's wife Emma died. In 1913, Dugdale moved into Hardy's home Max Gate in Dorchester, Dorset. In 1914, they married at St Andrew's Church, Enfield.

During the marriage, Dugdale found herself increasingly in the shadow of Hardy's first wife (whom Hardy had neglected while she was alive). Hardy's frantic and subdued love poetry—written with Emma in mind—was a cause of embarrassment and misery for Dugdale. Nevertheless, in 1928, when Hardy died aged 87, she was so stricken with grief that a doctor was required.

She was credited as the author of Hardy's posthumously published biography, The Early Life and Later Years of Thomas Hardy, although it was written (mostly or entirely) by Hardy himself in his old age.

The Hardys were friends of T. E. Lawrence, and Dugdale attended his funeral in 1935.

Dugdale died at Max Gate, the home she had shared with Hardy, of cancer, aged 58. She was cremated in Woking Crematorium, and her ashes were buried in Stinsford churchyard, where Hardy's heart and his first wife were interred.

== Publications ==
- Dugdale, Florence Emily (1912). The Book of Baby Birds. London: Hodder & Stoughton. Illustrated by Edward Julius Detmold.
- Dugdale, Florence Emily (c. 1919). Cousin Christine. Collins Clear-Type Press. Illustrated by W. E. Evans.
- Hardy, Florence Emily (1928). The Early Life of Thomas Hardy, 1840–1891. London: Macmillan.
- Hardy, Florence Emily (1930). The Later Years of Thomas Hardy, 1892–1928. London: Macmillan.
