= The Dynasts =

English-language closet drama

The Dynasts is an English-language epic in verse and prose by Thomas Hardy. Hardy himself described this work as "an epic-drama of the war with Napoleon, in three parts, nineteen acts and one hundred and thirty scenes". Not counting the Forescene and the Afterscene, the exact total number of scenes is 131. The verse is primarily iambic pentameter, occasionally tetrameter, and often with rhymes. The three parts were published in 1904, 1906 and 1908.

Because of the ambition and scale of the work, Hardy acknowledged in his Preface to the work that The Dynasts was "intended simply for mental performance, and not for the stage", and described the work as "the longest English drama in existence". Scholars have noted that Hardy remembered war stories of the veterans of the Napoleonic wars in his youth, and used them as partial inspiration for writing The Dynasts many years later in his own old age. In addition, Hardy was a distant relative of Captain Thomas Hardy, who had served with Admiral Horatio Nelson at Trafalgar. Hardy consulted a number of histories and also visited Waterloo, Belgium, as part of his research.

George Orwell wrote that Hardy had "set free his genius" by writing this drama and thought its main appeal was "in the grandiose and rather evil vision of armies marching and counter-marching through the mists, and men dying by hundreds of thousands in the Russian snows, and all for absolutely nothing."

== Synopsis ==
In addition to the various historical figures, The Dynasts also contains an extensive tragic chorus of metaphysical figures ("Spirits" and "Ancient Spirits") who observe and discuss the events.

Part First contains a Forescene and six Acts with 35 Scenes. The time period of the events in Part First covers 10 months, from March 1805, the time when Napoleon repeated his coronation ceremony at Milan and took up the crown of Lombardy, to January 1806, the time of the death of William Pitt the Younger. The principal historical events entail Napoleon's invasion plans for England, which are abandoned when French Admiral Pierre-Charles Villeneuve sails for the south, the Battle of Trafalgar, and subsequently the Battle of Ulm and the Battle of Austerlitz. The division of the Acts and its Scenes is as follows:

Fore Scene. The Overworld

Act First:

- Scene I. England – A Ridge in Wessex
- Scene II. Paris – Office of the Minister of Marine
- Scene III. London – The Old House of Commons
- Scene IV. The Harbour of Boulogne
- Scene V. London – The House of a Lady of Quality
- Scene VI. Milan. The Cathedral

Act Second:

- Scene I. The Dockyard, Gibraltar
- Scene II. Off Ferrol
- Scene III. The Camp and Harbour of Boulogne
- Scene IV. South Wessex – A Ridge-like Down near the Coast
- Scene V. The Same – Rainbarrows' Beacon, Egdon Heath

Act Third:

- Scene I. The Chateau at Pont-de-Briques
- Scene II. The Frontiers of Upper Austria and Bavaria
- Scene III. Boulogne – The St Omer Road

Act Fourth:

- Scene I. King George's Watering-place, South Wessex
- Scene II. Before the City of Ulm
- Scene III. Ulm – Within the City
- Scene IV. Before Ulm – The Same Day
- Scene V. The Same – The Michaelsberg
- Scene VI. London – Spring Gardens

Act Fifth:

- Scene I. Off Cape Trafalgar
- Scene II. The Same – The Quarter-deck of the "Victory"
- Scene III. The Same – On Board the "Bucentaure"
- Scene IV. The Same – The Cockpit of the "Victory"
- Scene V. London – The Guildhall
- Scene VI. An Inn at Rennes
- Scene VII. King George's Watering-place, South Wessex

Act Sixth:

- Scene I. The Field of Austerlitz – The French Position
- Scene II. The Same – The Russian Position
- Scene III. The Same – The French Position
- Scene IV. The Same – The Russian Position
- Scene V. The Same – Near the Windmill of Paleny
- Scene VI. Shockerwick House, near Bath
- Scene VII. Paris – A Street leading to the Tuileries
- Scene VIII. Putney – Bowling Green House

Part Second contains six Acts with 43 Scenes. The time period of the events of Part Second ranges over 7 years, from 1806 to just before the French invasion of Russia in 1812. The listing of the Acts and Scenes is as follows:

Act First:

- Scene I. London – Fox's Lodgings, Arlington Street
- Scene II. The Route between London and Paris
- Scene III. The Streets of Berlin
- Scene IV. The Field of Jena
- Scene V. Berlin – A Room overlooking a Public Place
- Scene VI. The Same
- Scene VII. Tilsit and the River Niemen
- Scene VIII. The Same

Act Second:

- Scene I. The Pyrenees and Valleys adjoining
- Scene II. Aranjuez, near Madrid – A Room in the Palace of Godoy, the "Prince of Peace"
- Scene III. London – The Marchioness of Salisbury's
- Scene IV. Madrid and its Environs
- Scene V. The Open Sea between the English Coasts and the Spanish Peninsula
- Scene VI. St Cloud – The Boudoir of Josephine
- Scene VII. Vimiero

Act Third:

- Scene I. Spain – A Road near Astorga
- Scene II. The Same
- Scene III. Before Coruna
- Scene IV. Coruna – Near the Ramparts
- Scene V. Vienna – A Cafe in the Stephans-Platz

Act Fourth:

- Scene I. A Road out of Vienna
- Scene II. The Island of Lobau, with Wagram beyond
- Scene III. The Field of Wagram
- Scene IV. The Field of Talavera
- Scene V. The Same
- Scene VI. Brighton – The Royal Pavilion
- Scene VII. The Same
- Scene VIII. Walcheren

Act Fifth:

- Scene I. Paris – A Ballroom in the House of Cambaceres
- Scene II. Paris – The Tuileries
- Scene III. Vienna – A Private Apartment in the Imperial Palace
- Scene IV. London – A Club in St. James's Street
- Scene V. The old West Highway out of Vienna
- Scene VI. Courcelles
- Scene VII. Petersburg – The Palace of the Empress-Mother
- Scene VIII. Paris – The Grand Gallery of the Louvre and the Salon-Carre adjoining

Act Sixth:

- Scene I. The Lines of Torres Vedras
- Scene II. The Same – Outside the Lines
- Scene III. Paris – The Tuileries
- Scene IV. Spain – Albuera
- Scene V. Windsor Castle – A Room in the King's Apartments
- Scene VI. London – Carlton House and the Streets adjoining
- Scene VII. The Same – The Interior of Carlton House

Part Third contains seven Acts with 53 Scenes, and an After Scene. The historical time period of Part Third covers Napoleon's invasion of Russia in 1812 to his defeat at the Battle of Waterloo in 1815. The division of the Acts and Scenes is as follows:

Act First:

- Scene I. The Banks of the Niemen, near Kowno
- Scene II. The Ford of Santa Marta, Salamanca
- Scene III. The Field of Salamanca
- Scene IV. The Field of Borodino
- Scene V. The Same
- Scene VI. Moscow
- Scene VII. The Same – Outside the City
- Scene VIII. The Same – The Interior of the Kremlin
- Scene IX. The Road from Smolensko into Lithuania
- Scene X. The Bridge of the Beresina
- Scene XI. The Open Country between Smorgoni and Wilna
- Scene XII. Paris – The Tuileries

Act Second:

- Scene I. The Plain of Vitoria
- Scene II. The Same, from the Puebla Heights
- Scene III. The Same – The Road from the Town
- Scene IV. A Fete at Vauxhall Gardens

Act Third:

- Scene I. Leipzig – Napoleon's Quarters in the Reudnitz Suburb
- Scene II. The Same – The City and the Battlefield
- Scene III. The Same – From the Tower of the Pleissenburg
- Scene IV. The Same – At the Thonberg Windmill
- Scene V. The Same – A Street near the Ranstadt Gate
- Scene VI. The Pyrenees – Near the River Nivelle

Act Fourth:

- Scene I. The Upper Rhine
- Scene II. Paris – The Tuileries
- Scene III. The Same – The Apartments of the Empress
- Scene IV. Fontainebleau – A Room in the Palace
- Scene V. Bayonne – The British Camp
- Scene VI. A Highway in the Outskirts of Avignon
- Scene VII. Malmaison – The Empress Josephine's Bedchamber
- Scene VIII. London – The Opera-House

Act Fifth:

- Scene I. Elba – The Quay, Porto Ferrajo
- Scene II. Vienna – The Imperial Palace
- Scene III. La Mure, near Grenoble
- Scene IV. Schonbrunn
- Scene V. London – The Old House of Commons
- Scene VI. Wessex – Durnover Green, Casterbridge

Act Sixth:

- Scene I. The Belgian Frontier
- Scene II. A Ballroom in Brussels
- Scene III. Charleroi – Napoleon's Quarters
- Scene IV. A Chamber overlooking a Main Street in Brussels
- Scene V. The Field of Ligny
- Scene VI. The Field of Quatre-Bras
- Scene VII. Brussels – The Place Royale
- Scene VIII. The Road to Waterloo

Act Seventh:

- Scene I. The Field of Waterloo
- Scene II. The Same – The French Position
- Scene III. Saint Lambert's Chapel Hill
- Scene IV. The Field of Waterloo – The English Position
- Scene V. The Same – The Women's Camp near Mont Saint-Jean
- Scene VI. The Same – The French Position
- Scene VII. The Same – The English Position
- Scene VIII. The Same – Later
- Scene IX. The Wood of Bossu

After Scene. The Overworld

== Analysis ==
The design of The Dynasts is extremely ambitious, and because of its coverage of historical events of the same era, has received comparison to Tolstoy's War and Peace. Emma Clifford has written that Hardy used Tolstoy's novel as one of many sources of inspiration for the work, and in fact owned an early translation. However, it was not necessarily as a primary source, as Hardy also drew on the History of Europe by Archibald Alison, among others.

Hardy juxtaposes scenes of ordinary life with scenes involving the principal historical figures of the age, and concentrating on their desire to found dynasties to preserve their power. There are extensive descriptions of landscape and battle scenes that are characterised by shifts of visual perspective that, in the opinion of John Wain, anticipate cinematic techniques. George Witter Sherman has postulated on Hardy's observations of life in London as influences on elements of The Dynasts. Elna Sherman has discussed Hardy's references to music and songs in the work. Anna Henchman has written about Hardy's use of imagery in the manner of astronomical observation at great distances from the earth in this work. Lawrence Jones has analysed Hardy's idiosyncrasies in his manner of narrative in The Dynasts. J.O. Bailey has postulated an analogy of the Spirits in The Dynasts with other Mephistopheles-like figures in literature, and in relation to the Book of Job.
