= Max Gate =

Grade I listed house in Dorset, England

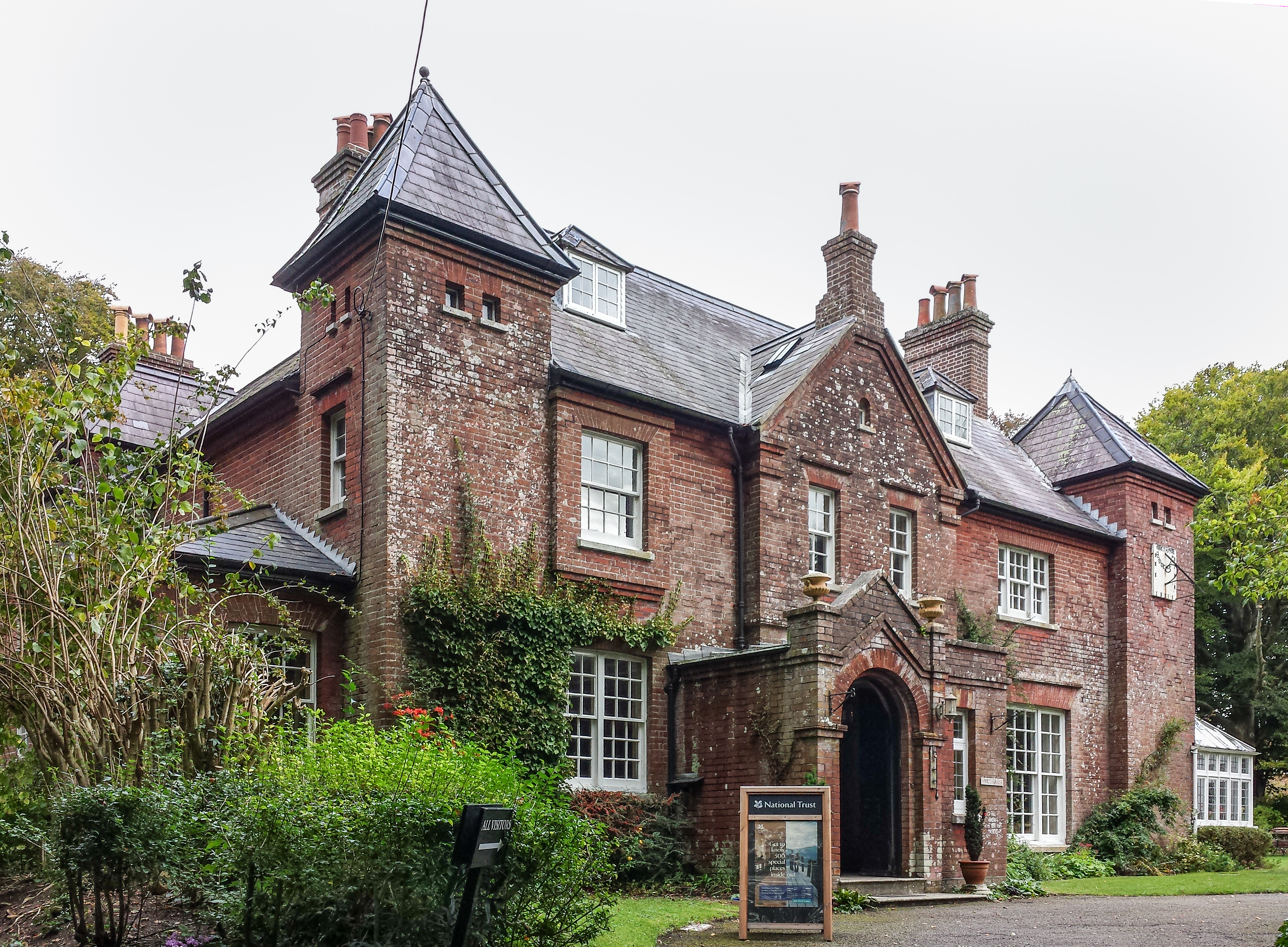
- Max Gate 2015

- Location within Dorset

General information
- Location: Dorchester, Dorset
- Coordinates: 50.7081°N 2.4200°W

Max Gate is the former home of Thomas Hardy and is located on the outskirts of Dorchester, Dorset, England. It was designed and built by Thomas Hardy for his own use in 1885 and he lived there until his death in 1928. In 1940 it was bequeathed to the National Trust by Hardy's sister and is now open to the public. It was designated as a Grade I listed building on 8 May 1970.

== Description ==
The house is a Grade I listed building, having been so designated since 8 May 1970. It was designed by Thomas Hardy and built out of red brick in 1885 in Queen Anne style. The architecture is more similar to country houses designed by Philip Webb rather than those designed by Richard Norman Shaw.

Thomas Hardy had purchased one and a half acres of land to build the house and was delighted to find Roman relics on the land. The building work was done by his father, who was a builder, and his brother. The name of the house was a pun on the name of a nearby toll-house known as "Mack's Gate" after a previous gate-keeper, Henry Mack. Originally Hardy's house had two rooms downstairs with two rooms above, but Hardy soon found this insufficient for his needs and the house was expanded in 1895, with further additions following. He used three different rooms as studies at different periods of his life. Wanting privacy, Hardy planted a thousand pine trees round the house as a windbreak. In time these grew so vigorously that the house was rendered dark and gloomy, and his second wife, Florence, removed them after his death.

== History ==
Hardy designed and lived in Max Gate from 1885 until his death in 1928. He lived there with his first wife Emma, and then with his second wife Florence. It was there that he wrote Tess of the d'Urbervilles, Jude the Obscure and The Mayor of Casterbridge, as well as much of his poetry.

In 1940, Hardy's sister Kate left the house to the National Trust with the stipulation that it should be lived in. The house has been continually occupied since then. It was first opened to the public in 1994 with restricted access and limited opening times for a few days a week. Beginning in 2011 the National Trust opened all three floors of the house to the public five days a week (from March to October), allowing access to the hall, drawing room, two studies, the dining room and the kitchen. In 2013 two bedrooms were also opened up for the first time, including the room where Thomas Hardy wrote the Mayor of Casterbridge and where he died. The house contains several pieces of Hardy's furniture, although his study has been relocated to the Dorset Museum.

== Neolithic archaeology ==
Half of the 100m diameter Neolithic interrupted ditch enclosure known as Flagstones is under the grounds of Max Gate; the other half was archaeologically excavated in 1987 prior to the construction of the Dorchester bypass.
