= Moments of Vision =

Moments of Vision and Miscellaneous Verses is a collection of poems by English poet Thomas Hardy published in 1917. His largest poetic collection (including as it did the wartime sequence 'Poems of War and Patriotism'), Moments of Vision is (for Hardy's poetry) unusually unified in emotional tone, and is considered to include some of the finest work of his late poetic career.

== Themes ==
The key-note (and title) of the collection was given by the opening poem, with its examination of the mystery of consciousness in a material world, setting the stage for the introspective meditation on human feeling that pervades much of the volume. Having successfully achieved an integration of past and present in the Poems 1912-13, Hardy was able to capitalise on his ability to work through long-buried emotions in the present, balancing the vitality of his past visions against the march of time.

Some thirty poems related to his first wife, Emma, while other notable poems included were "The Last Signal", on William Barnes, and "Logs on the Hearth" about his recently deceased sister.

== Influence ==
- Virginia Woolf took Hardy's phrase as a key to the occasions of heightened intensity that gave meaning to life: "the year is marked by moments of great intensity. Hardy's 'moments of vision'".

== See also ==
- William Wordsworth
- World War I in literature
