= A Pair of Blue Eyes =

1873 novel by Thomas Hardy

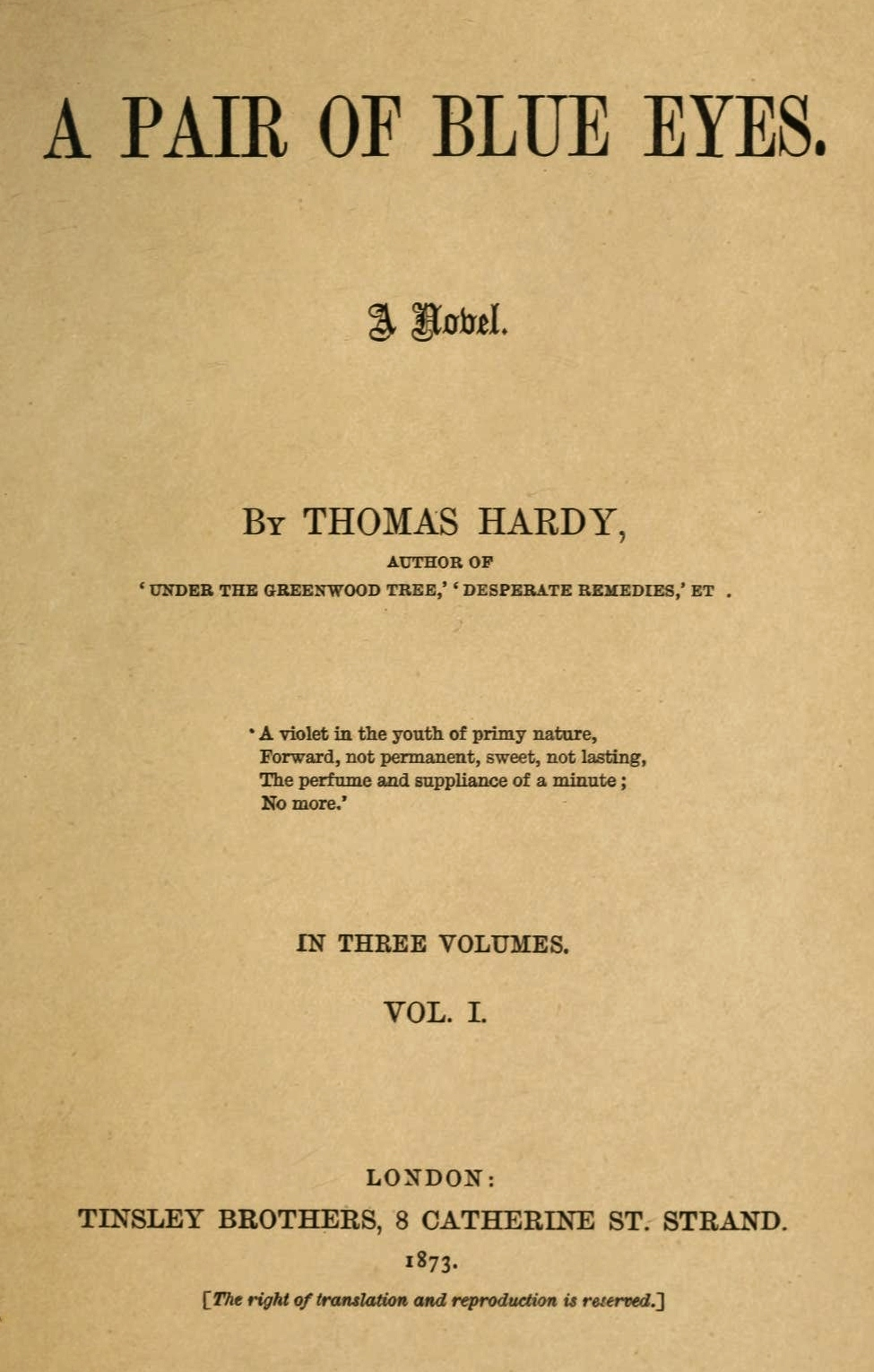
- First edition title page
- Author: Thomas Hardy
- Language: English
- Genre: Novel
- Publisher: Tinsley Brothers
- Publication date: May 1873
- Publication place: United Kingdom
- Media type: Print (hardcover)
- Pages: 3 volumes
- Preceded by: Under the Greenwood Tree
- Followed by: Far from the Madding Crowd

A Pair of Blue Eyes is English author Thomas Hardy's third published novel and the first to be serialised, and also the first to bear his name. It is ultimately a tragic story of a rector's daughter in a Wessex village who is courted by multiple men. Critics have generally classified it among Hardy's lesser works. He later placed it in the "Romances and Fantasies" category of his collected fiction.

== Plot summary ==
The novel describes a love triangle involving a beautiful, blue-eyed 19-year-old woman, Elfride Swancourt, and two suitors from markedly different backgrounds.

Her widowed father, Christopher, is the rector of a village parish "on the sea-swept outskirts of Lower Wessex". Stephen Smith is a handsome young architect's assistant who stays with the Swancourts to help with a church restoration project. He is smitten with Elfride and she comes to love him. He tells her, with embarrassment, of his very humble origins; he is the impoverished son of a local stone mason, which means the Smiths are socially inferior to the Swancourts. When Stephen asks Elfride's father to consent to the marriage, Christopher declares it an unsuitable match and orders Stephen to leave. Stephen and Elfride become secretly engaged. He accepts an architecture job in India that will enable him to save money for several years, with the hope of returning to England a prosperous professional who will then be allowed to marry Elfride.

Meanwhile, Christopher remarries and his wealthy second wife is a cousin of Henry Knight, a sophisticated bachelor in his early 30s (though sexually inexperienced) who reviews books and writes essays for a London magazine. He visits the Swancourts, and Elfride falls in love with him, forgetting about her attachment to Stephen Smith. Knight overcomes his fear of women and grows enamored of Elfride and proposes to her. Christopher approves of the marriage because of Knight's social station. Knight and Smith are actually longtime friends, with Knight in the mentor role, but he does not know of Smith's previous liaison with Elfride.

She finds herself caught in a battle with her heart, her mind, and the expectations of those around her. Tension arises during Knight's engagement to Elfride because he insists on being her first and only love. When he pressures her into admitting that she was engaged once before (she conceals that it was to Smith), Knight becomes disillusioned and angry and ends up rejecting her. He leaves England to spend time travelling throughout continental Europe.

Elfride, out of lonely desperation, marries a third man, Lord Luxellian, who lives nearby and was recently widowed. After five months of marriage, she dies from complications of a miscarriage. In the novel's conclusion, Smith and Knight, both having forgiven Elfride, are riding by train together to see her. Each is intent on reclaiming her hand, but neither is aware that she has already married and died, and that they are in fact accompanying her corpse and coffin as they travel.

The novel has various settings including Gothic churches, coastal cliffs, hills, valleys, and beaches.

== Characters ==
Elfride Swancourt, the 19-year-old heroine, is extremely attractive and emotionally naïve; she knows little about herself or about men, but with her intelligence, instinct and "Miranda-like curiosity", she is confident she will learn about both in due time.

Christopher Swancourt, her father, a widower and the rector in the village; he remarries to the rich Mrs. Troyton.

Stephen Smith, Elfride's first suitor is socially her inferior, but also has a childlike innocence; she loves him because he is "so docile and gentle".

Henry Knight, the second suitor is more socially adept and dominantly masculine, but he is a romantically immature man who demands Elfride's spiritual as well as physical virginity.

Lord Spenser Luxellian, a widower in the village, and Elfride's eventual husband.

== Background ==
This was the third of Hardy's novels to be published and the first to bear his name (his two previous novels were published anonymously). It was also the first of his novels to be serialised—a practice he would follow in his subsequent fiction. A Pair of Blue Eyes appeared in eleven instalments between September 1872 and July 1873 in Tinsley's Magazine. It was then published in book form, in three hardback volumes, by Tinsley Brothers in May 1873. About 500 copies were printed. In July 1873, it was published as a single volume in the U.S. by Henry Holt.

The novel is notable for its strong parallels to the real-life courtship of Hardy and his first wife Emma Gifford. Like Stephen Smith, the young Hardy was an architect's assistant (while also trying to establish himself as a published author), who met Gifford during a church restoration assignment at St Juliot in Cornwall, England. Of Hardy's early novels, A Pair of Blue Eyes is probably the most densely populated with autobiographical events.

== Reception ==
A reviewer in the Examiner called it "not so exclusively pictoral [as Under the Greenwood Tree]; it was study of a more tragic kind, with more complex characters and a more stirring plot.... Both Under the Greenwood Tree and A Pair of Blue Eyes are very remarkable novels, which no one could read without admiring the close and penetrating observation, and pictoral and narrative power of the writer."

Although A Pair of Blue Eyes garnered famous admirers—e.g., Alfred Tennyson told Hardy he liked it best of all his novels, and Marcel Proust said it was "of all books the one he would himself most gladly have written"—it is usually placed with Hardy's minor works, "a book with a few good points but a failure as a whole". In a 1983 journal article, Judith Wittenberg wrote that A Pair of Blue Eyes and Hardy's prior Desperate Remedies (1871) "are the weaker of the first four novels. Among their more striking flaws is a preponderance of melodramatic, even macabre, scenes that are insufficiently prepared for characterologically and inadequately integrated with other elements of the narrative."

A focus of critical interest in A Pair of Blue Eyes has been the scene in which Knight falls over a steep, sea-facing cliff and hangs precariously (reputedly the origin of the term "cliffhanger") while Elfride works to rescue him. She eventually succeeds by creating a makeshift rope from her linen undergarments and pulling him up to safety. Carl J. Weber sources the scene to a picnic Hardy and his wife had in which he was sent to search for a lost earring. British critic Robert Gittings claims it is more likely that the scene was inspired by Leslie Stephen's essay "Five minutes in the Alps". Literary scholar John Halperin posits that the "cliff without a name" is probably based on Beeny Cliff.

Weber asserts that the cliffhanger scene is the "first indication in the novels of Hardy's ability to sustain interest in a tense situation by sheer power of vivid description." By contrast, Michael Millgate dismisses it as "irrelevant picture-painting typical of a novel which is little more than 'a kind of rag-bag of information, ideas, descriptive vignettes, personal experiences, fragments of the author's brief literary past'". For Jean Brooks, the scene is an illustration of "cosmic indifference", also highlighting the comic aspects of the rescue.

== Adaptations ==
In 1908, Hardy met with composer Sir Edward Elgar and discussed the possibility of Elgar basing an opera on A Pair of Blue Eyes, but World War I cut short those plans.

In 2008, BBC Radio 7 recorded the novel as a serial, with Jeremy Irons as Henry Knight.
