= Desperate Remedies =

1871 sensation novel by Thomas Hardy

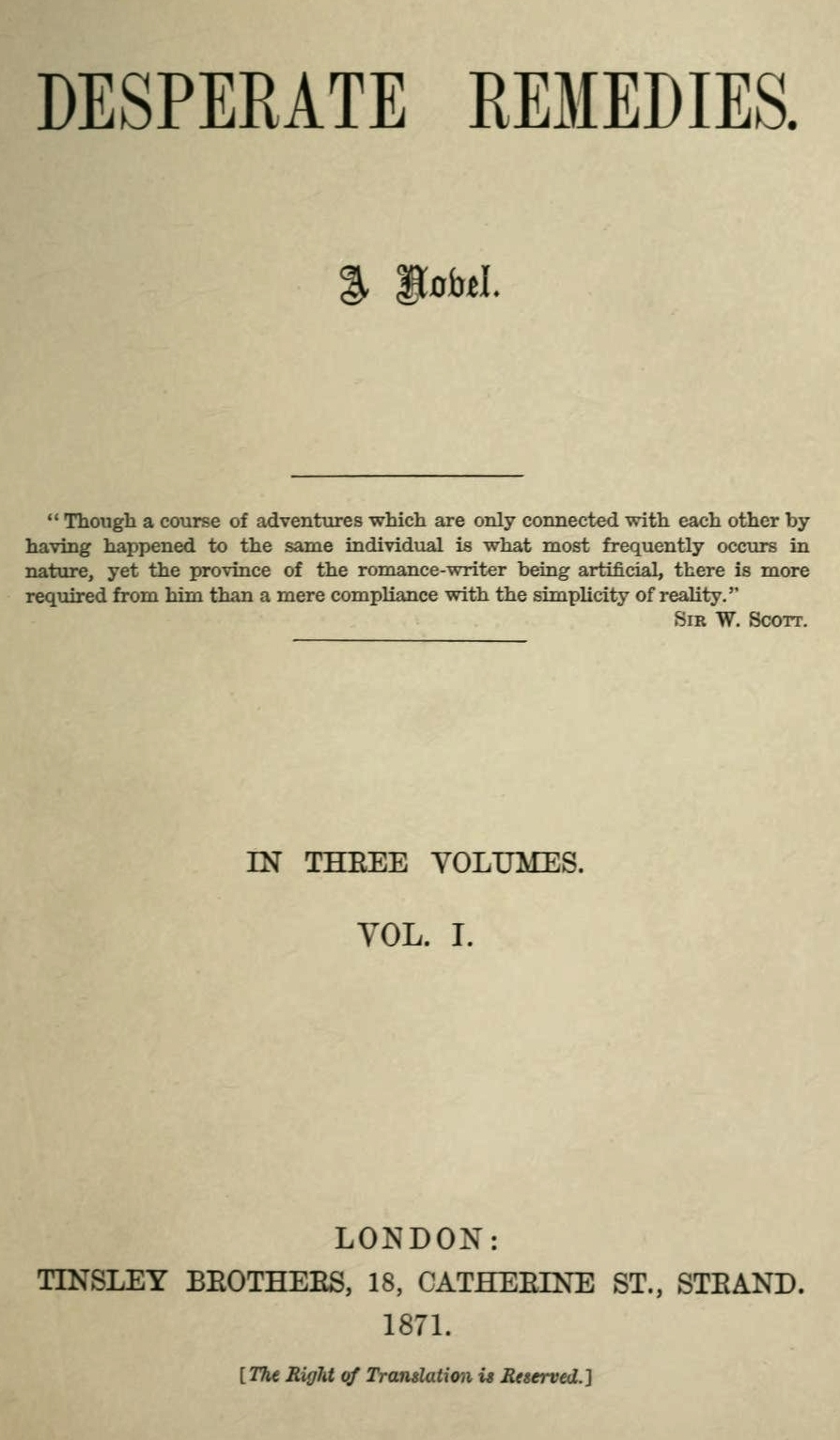
- First edition title page
- Author: Thomas Hardy
- Language: English
- Genre: Sensation novel
- Publisher: Tinsley Brothers
- Publication date: 1871
- Publication place: United Kingdom
- Media type: Print (hardcover)

Desperate Remedies is the first published novel by English author Thomas Hardy. It is a sensation novel because it contains themes of bigamy, murder, illegitimacy, blackmail, and impersonation. It was released anonymously by Tinsley Brothers in 1871.

== Plot summary ==
In Desperate Remedies a young woman, Cytherea Graye, is forced by poverty to accept a post as lady's maid to the eccentric Miss Aldclyffe, the woman whom her father had loved but had been unable to marry.

Cytherea loves a young architect, Edward Springrove, but Miss Aldclyffe's machinations, the discovery that Edward is already engaged to a woman whom he does not love, and the urgent need to support a sick brother drive Cytherea to accept the hand of Aeneas Manston, Miss Aldclyffe's illegitimate son, whose first wife is believed to have perished in a fire; however, their marriage is almost immediately nullified when it emerges that his first wife had left the inn before it caught fire. Manston's wife, apparently, returns to live with him, but Cytherea, her brother, the local rector, and Edward come to suspect that the woman claiming to be Mrs. Manston is an impostor.

It emerges that Manston killed his wife in an argument after she left the inn, and had brought in the impostor to prevent his being prosecuted for murder, as the argument had been heard (but not seen) by a poacher, who suspected Manston of murder and had planned to go to the police if his wife did not turn up alive. In the novel's climax, Manston attempts to kidnap Cytherea and flee, but is stopped by Edward; he later commits suicide in his cell, and Cytherea and Edward marry.

== Publishing history ==
After Hardy had trouble publishing his first novel, he was told to "attempt a novel with a purely artistic purpose, giving it a more "complicated" plot than was attempted with his first, unpublished novel." The publication of Desperate Remedies was Hardy's breakthrough, and the first of a long string of novels that propelled him to the forefront of Victorian letters.

== Criticism ==
Some critics cite "quasi-gothic" elements in Desperate Remedies. It was positively reviewed in the Athenaeum and Morning Post. However, the review in The Spectator excoriated Hardy and his work, calling the book "a desperate remedy for an emaciated purse" and that the unknown author had "prostituted his powers to the purposes of idle prying into the way of wickedness." Hardy wrote of the review: "alas...The Spectator brought down its heaviest leaded pastoral staff on the prematurely happy volumes...the bitterness of that moment was never forgotten, at that moment I wished I was dead."
