= Time's Laughingstocks and Other Verses =

Time's Laughingstocks and Other Verses is a collection of poems by English poet Thomas Hardy, and was published in 1909. It includes poems of various dates, mainly concerned with rural, familial and provincial life.

== Dates and thematics ==
The collection contains poems of various dates, with almost a third of its 94 poems having been published before the book's publication. A not untypical thematic stress on life's ironies is present, though Hardy himself was insistent that the title phrase was a poetic image only, and not to be taken as a philosophical belief. He also pointed out that behind the "I" of the poems stood not autobiography so much as "dramatic monologues by different characters".

== Significant poems ==
Hardy himself considered "A Trampwoman's Tragedy" the best of all his poems. Gilbert Murray thought "He Abjures Love" had a Horatian quality; and Ezra Pound saw "The Revisitation" as anticipating Hardy's Poems 1912-13.

== See also ==
- Casterbridge Fair
