= The Hand of Ethelberta =

1876 novel by Thomas Hardy

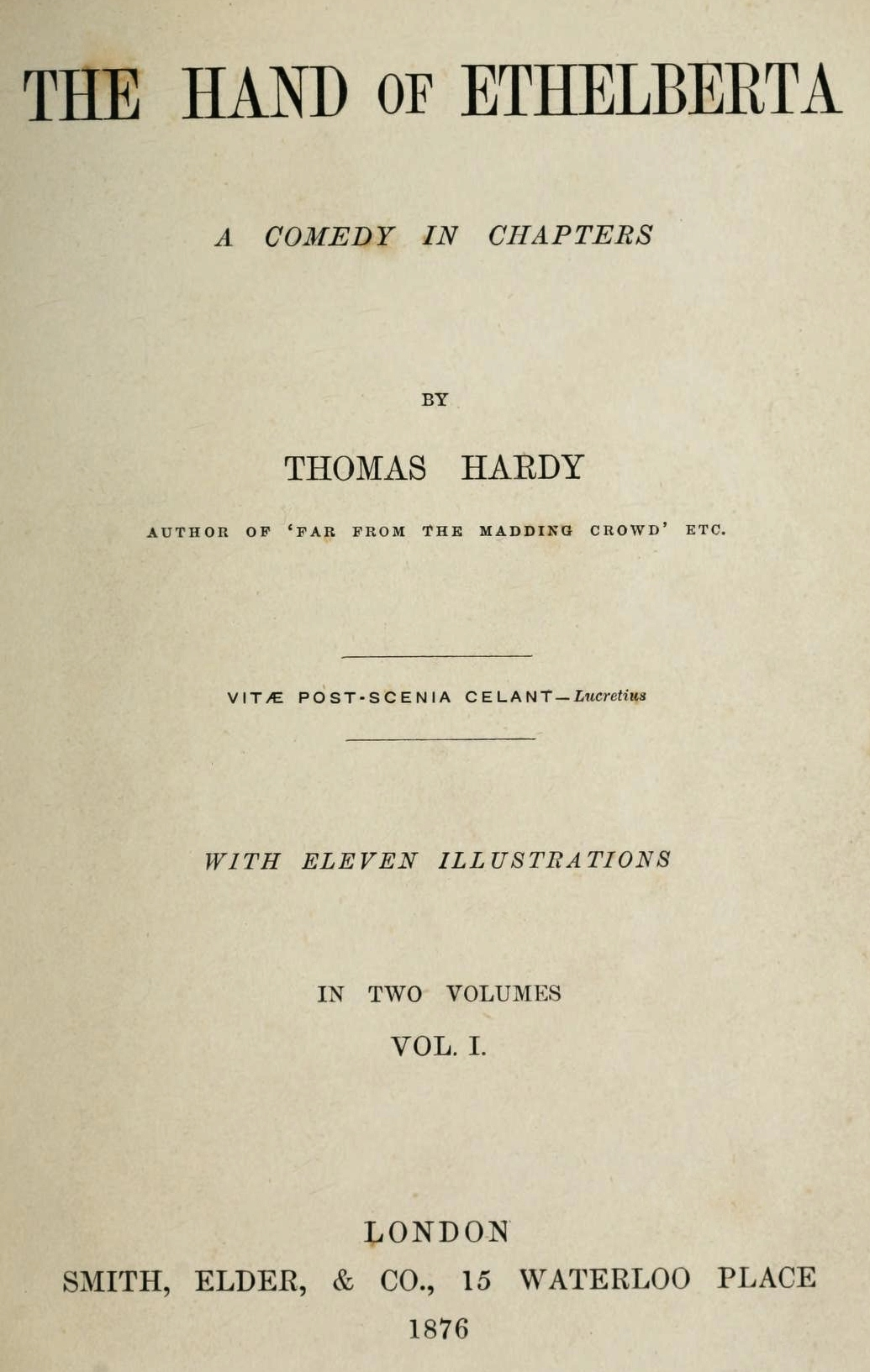
- First edition's title page
- Author: Thomas Hardy
- Language: English
- Genre: Novel
- Publisher: Cornhill Magazine
- Publication date: 5 November 1876
- Publication place: England

The Hand of Ethelberta: A Comedy in Chapters is the fifth published novel by English author Thomas Hardy, published in 1876. It was written, in serial form, for The Cornhill Magazine, which was edited by Leslie Stephen, a friend and mentor of Hardy. Unlike the majority of Hardy's fiction, the novel is a comedy, with both humour and a happy ending for the major characters and no suicides or tragic deaths. The late nineteenth century novelist George Gissing, who knew Hardy, considered it "surely old Hardy's poorest book".

== Plot summary ==
Ethelberta was raised in humble circumstances, but through her work as a governess married well at the age of 18. Her husband died two weeks after the wedding and, now 21, Ethelberta lives with her mother-in-law, Lady Petherwin. In the three years that have elapsed since the deaths of both her husband and father-in-law, Ethelberta has been treated to foreign travel and further privilege by her benefactress, but restricted from seeing her poor family.

The events of the story concern Ethelberta's career as a poet and storyteller as she struggles to support her family and conceal that her father is a butler. Beautiful, clever, and rational, she easily attracts four very persistent suitors, Mr. Christopher Julian, a struggling musician, Mr. Neigh and Mr. Ladywell, both gentlemen and friends, and Lord Mountclere, a 65-year old aristocrat with a dubious past. However, she is reluctant to give her much-coveted hand. She finally elects for Lord Mountclere, after he discovers the secret of her low birth and family, and she comes to dominate him, running his estate and saving him from bankruptcy. Her unrequited suitor Christopher Julian realises he would never have been happy with her had she married him, and settles for her younger sister Picotee who had been in love with him for years.

== Illustrations by George du Maurier ==
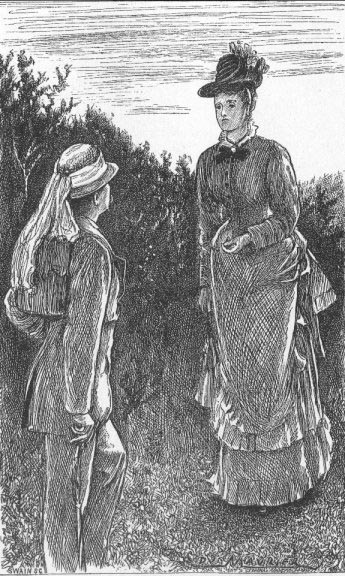
"She Stopped Like a Clock"

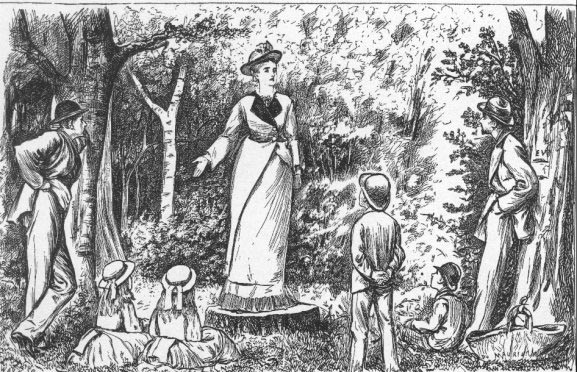
"Round Her, Leaning Against Branches, or Prostrate on the Ground, Were Two or Three Individuals"

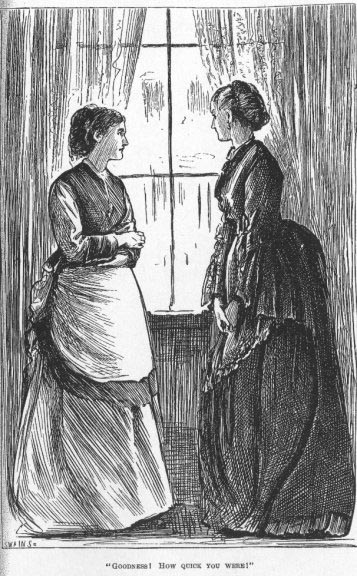
"Goodness! How Quick You Were"

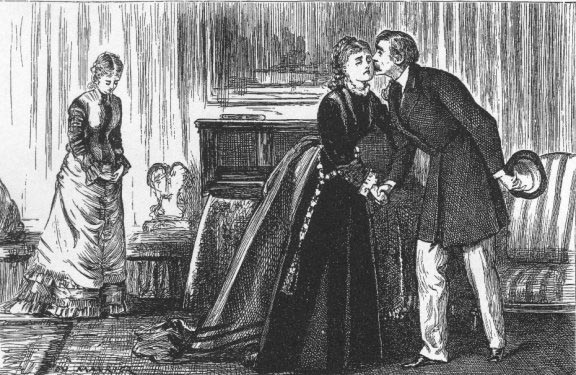
"It Was A Tender Time"

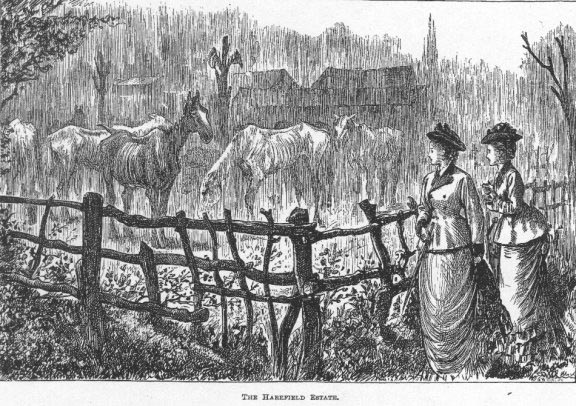
"The Harefield Estate"

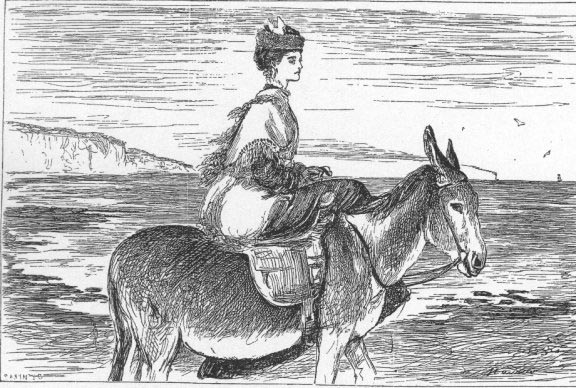
"So Ethelberta Went"

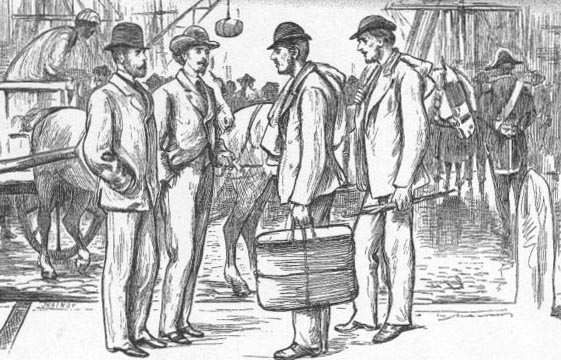
"Can You Tell Us the Way, Sir, to the Hotel Bold Soldier?"

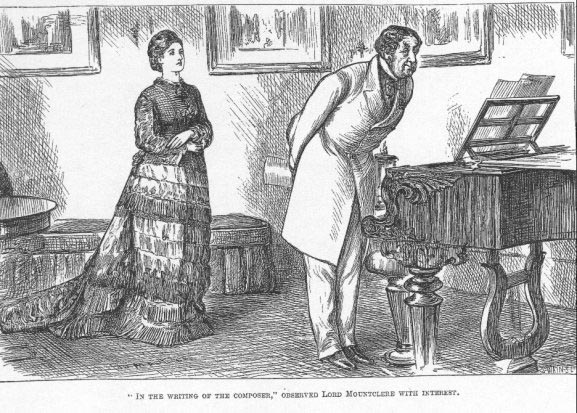
"'In the Writing of the Composer', Observed Lord Mountclere with Interest"

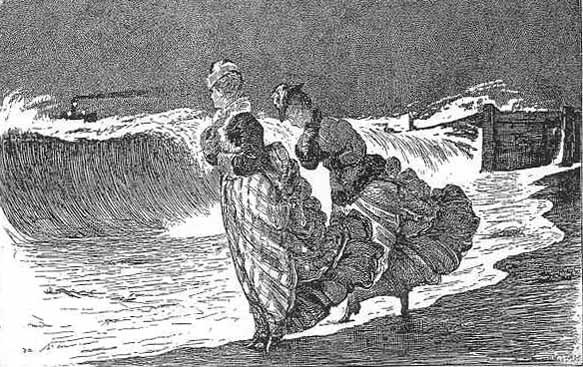
"All Before Them Was A Sheet of Whiteness"

"She Lessened in His Gaze, and Was Soon Out of Sight"

== Reception ==
Mr. Hardy retains his light touch. He is satirical without being ill-natured. His satire upon the "London correspondent" of a provincial paper is excellent. The little touches and glimpses of vanity by which he shows off his various characters are capital.

== Adaptations ==
It was adapted for BBC Radio 4 by Katherine Jakeways. The one-hour play was released just before International Women's Day 2021, as part of a series on Hardy's women.
