= Thomas Hardy's Cottage =

Coordinates: 50.7315°N 2.3863°W

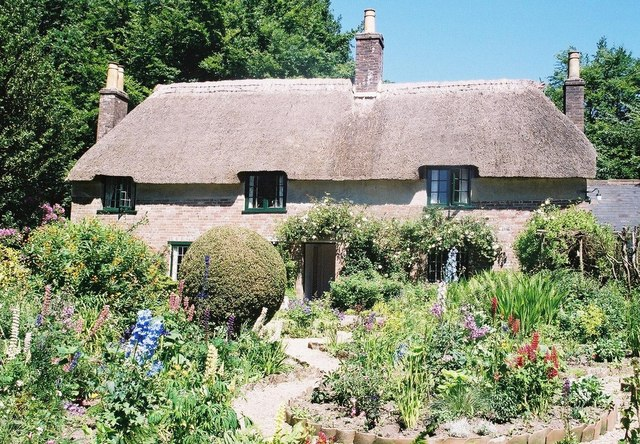
- Thomas Hardy's Cottage
- Interactive map of Thomas Hardy's Cottage
- Type: Cob and thatch building
- Location: Higher Bockhampton, Dorset, England, United Kingdom

History
- Built: 1800
- Original use: Birthplace of author Thomas Hardy

Site notes
- Governing body: National Trust

Thomas Hardy's Cottage, in Higher Bockhampton, Dorset, is a small cob and thatch building that is the birthplace of the English author Thomas Hardy. He was born there in 1840 and lived in the cottage until he was aged 34—during which time he wrote the novels Under the Greenwood Tree (1872) and Far from the Madding Crowd (1874)—when he left home to be married to Emma Gifford.

The cottage was built by Hardy's great-grandfather in 1800. It is now a National Trust property, and a popular tourist attraction. The property has a typical cottage garden, and the interior displays furniture which, although not from the Hardy family, is original to the period. The property is situated on the northern boundary of Thorncombe Wood. It is only three miles from Max Gate, the house that Hardy designed and lived in with Emma Gifford from 1885 until his death in 1928.

The cottage was given listed building status in 1956 and is listed Grade II the National Heritage List for England.

In 2012 the go ahead was given to a project to build a new visitor centre near the cottage. The project also included new trails in Thorncombe Wood. The project, which secured £525,000 from the Heritage Lottery Fund, was a joint partnership between Dorset County Council and the National Trust. The visitor centre opened in September 2014.

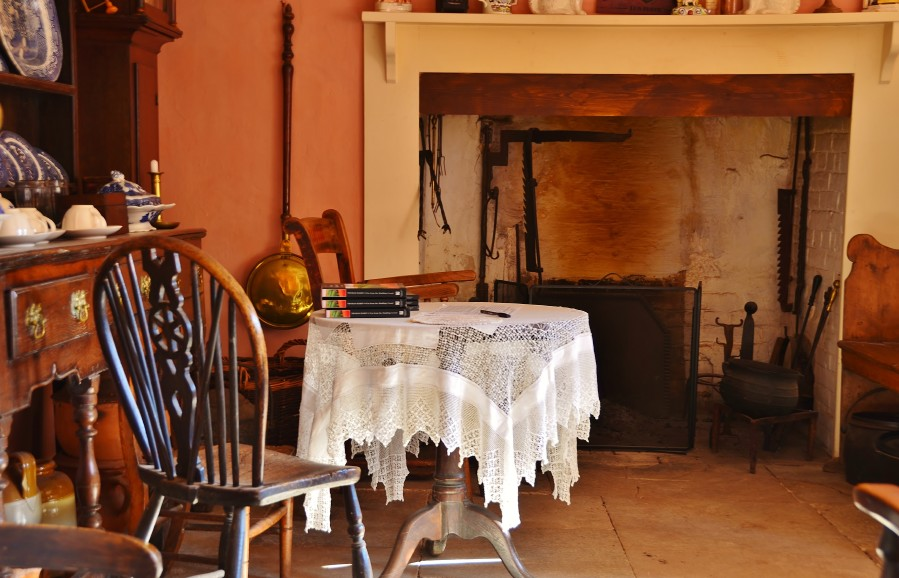

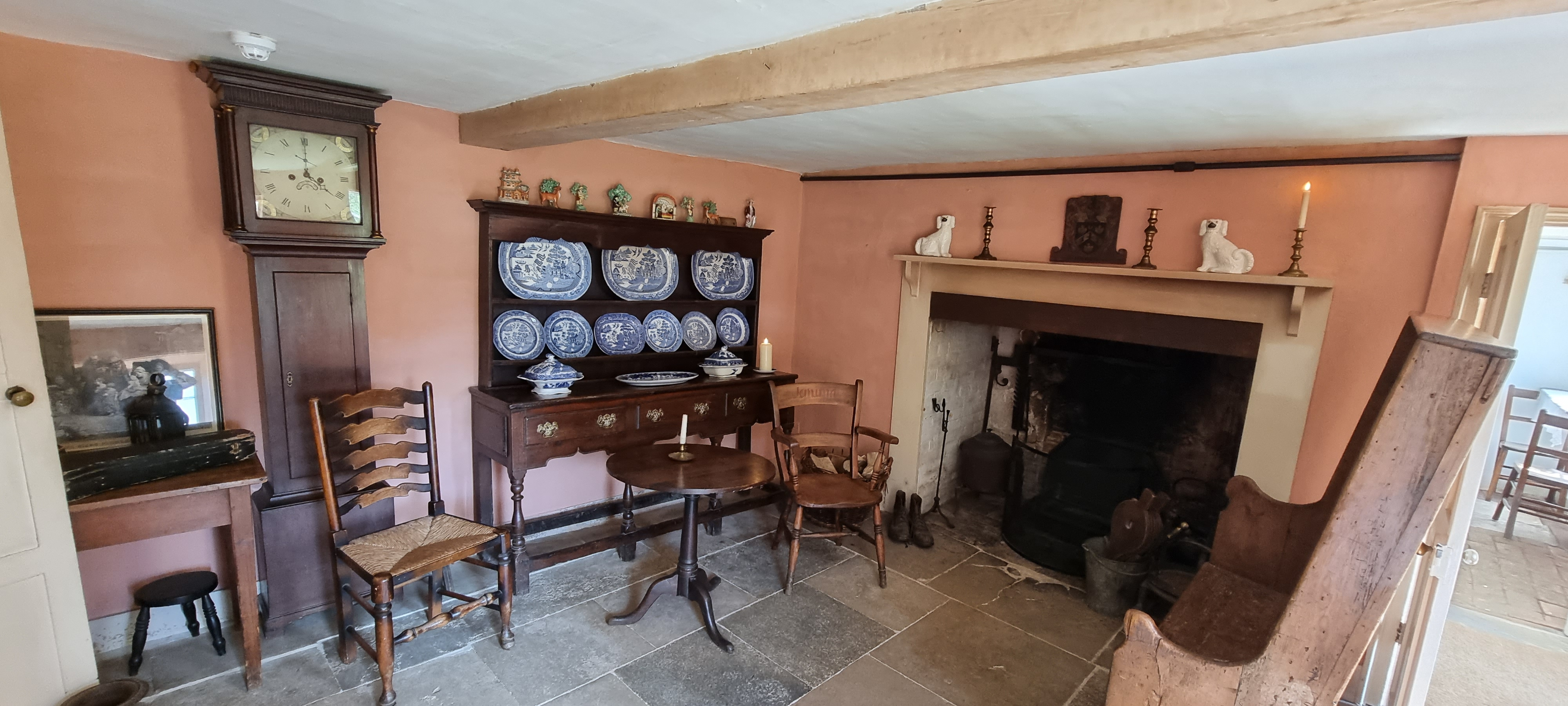

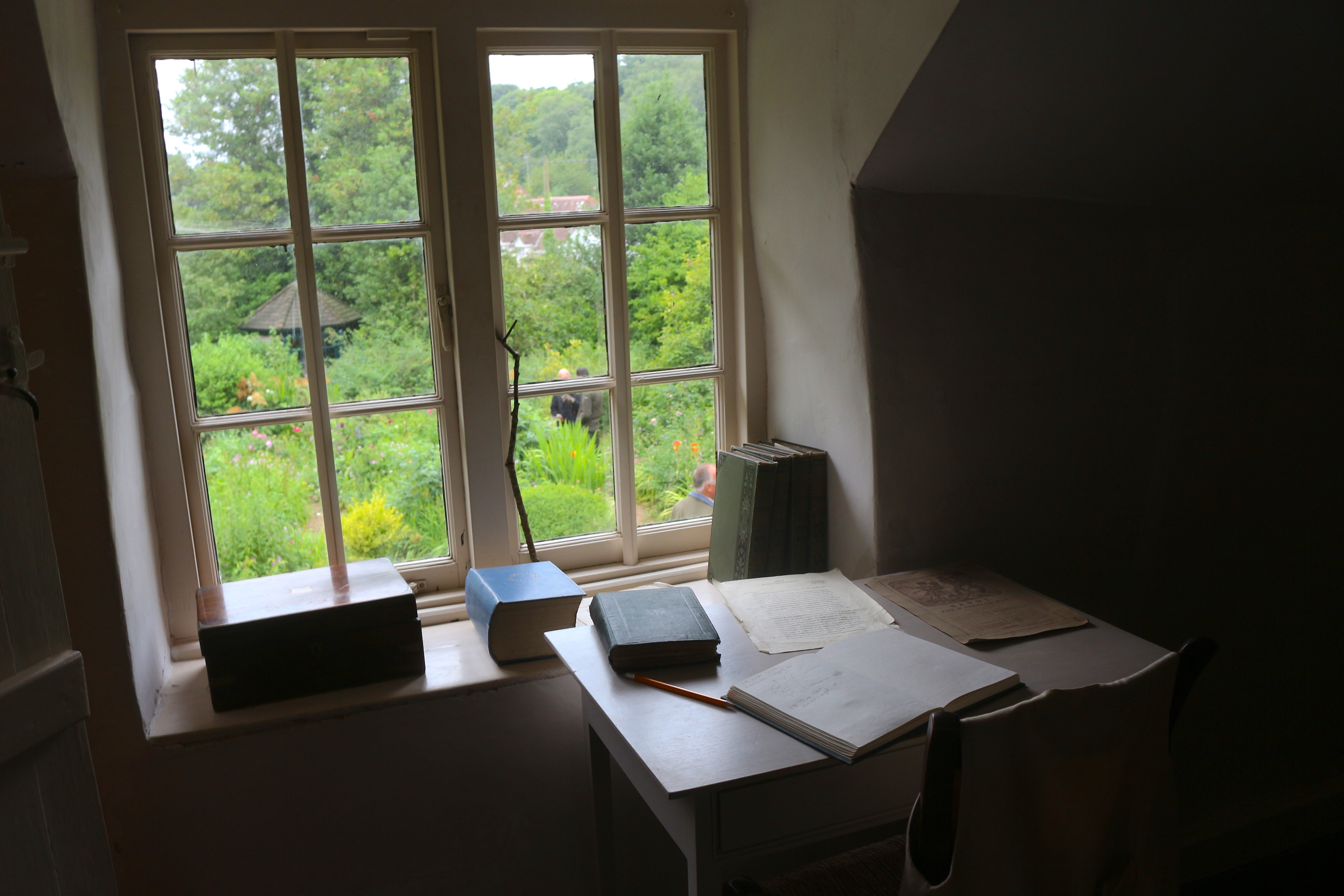
