= Late Lyrics and Earlier with Many Other Verses =

Late Lyrics and Earlier with Many Other Verses is a collection of poems by English poet Thomas Hardy, and was published in 1922. While covering a typical (for Hardy) range of subjects - such as mismatchings, grotesqueries, and ironic memories - the poems generally take a musical shape, often remembering the past in ballad format.

== Hardy's 'Apology' ==
Hardy prefaced the collection with a self-styled Apology, beginning prosaically by reporting some half of the poems included as recent, the remainder as old, but continuing with a broader defence of his poetic principles. Against charges of systematic pessimism, he maintained that his poetry was instead “really a series of fugitive impressions which I have never tried to co-ordinate”.

== Themes ==
As if to protest further the charge of pessimism, Hardy opened the collection with the cheerfully lyrical 'Weathers', though he closed it with the self-searching meditation 'Surview'. Other notable poems paid tribute to the friend of his youth, Horace Moule, and to his second wife, Florence Dugdale; while others recalled once again Hardy's first wife Emma, perhaps representing a final coming-to-terms with the memory of their marriage.

== Influence ==
Many of the poems have been subsequently set to music, by a variety of different composers.

== See also ==
- Lyric poetry
- Ode: Intimations of Immortality
- Positivism
