= Two on a Tower =

1882 novel by Thomas Hardy

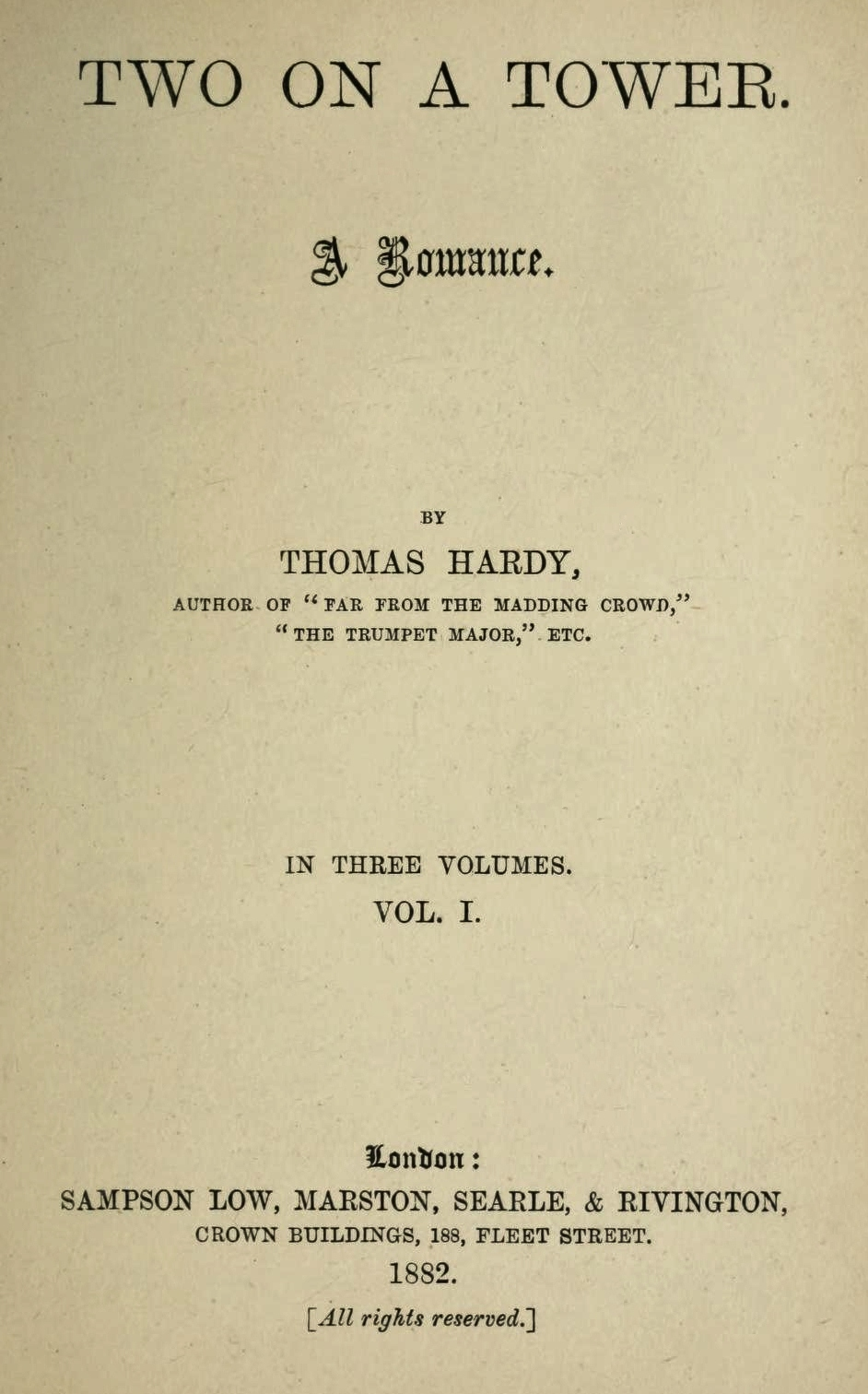
- First edition title page
- Author: Thomas Hardy
- Language: English
- Genre: Novel
- Publication date: 1882
- Publication place: United Kingdom
- Media type: Print

Two on a Tower: A Romance (1882) is a novel by English author Thomas Hardy, classified by him as a romance and fantasy. It is regarded as one of his minor works. It is one of Hardy's Wessex novels, set in late Victorian Dorset.

== Epigraph ==
Hardy placed an epigraph at the beginning of this book. The epigraph is from a Richard Crashaw poem, Love's Horoscope. It reads:

"Ah, my heart her eyes and she
Have taught thee new astrology.
Howe'er Love's native hours were set,
Whatever starry synod met,
'Tis in the mercy of her eye,
If poor Love shall live or die."

== Plot ==
Two on a Tower is a tale of star-crossed love in which Hardy sets the emotional lives of his two lovers against the background of the stellar universe. The unhappily married Lady Constantine breaks all the rules of social decorum when she falls in love with Swithin St. Cleeve, an astronomer who is ten years her junior. Her husband's death leaves the lovers free to marry, but the discovery of a legacy forces them apart. This is Hardy's most complete treatment of the theme of love across the class and age divide and the fullest expression of his fascination with science and astronomy.

== Background ==
In the 1895 preface Hardy wrote, "The scene of the action was suggested by two real spots in the part of the country specified, each of which has a column standing upon it. Certain surrounding peculiarities have been imported into the narrative from both sites." Wimborne was the location of the "little town" of "Warborne", and Charborough House was the location of the "Welland House" in Two on a Tower.

Hardy's intention, in his own words, was to "set the emotional history of two infinitesimal lives against the stupendous background of the stellar universe".

== Criticism ==
Because the book defied the social norms of the day, upon release the book was called shocking, repulsive, and one critic called it Hardy's "worst yet." Hardy's biographer Claire Tomalin says Hardy was "writing for serialization, which drove him to pack in far too much plot," and he wrote too fast "without time to think or reconsider."

Hardy wrote in a letter to Edmund Gosse on 10 Dec 1882, "I get most extraordinary criticisms of T. on a T. Eminent critics write & tell me in private that it is the most original thing I have done...while other eminent critics (I wonder if they are the same) print the most cutting rebukes you can conceive—show me (to my amazement) that I am quite an immoral person...”

== See also ==
- Illegitimacy in fiction
- Thomas Hardy's Wessex
- Victorian literature
