= Satires of Circumstance =

Satires of Circumstance is a collection of poems by English poet Thomas Hardy, and was published in 1914. It includes the 18 poem sequence Poems of 1912–13 on the death of Hardy's wife Emma - extended to the now-classic 21 poems in Collected Poems of 1919 - widely regarded to comprise the best work of his poetic career.

== Title and structure ==
The collection's title was picked by the publisher, and disapproved of by Hardy, emphasising as it did the 15 light-hearted satires and sketches of 1910, at the expense of the Poems of 1912–13 themselves, as well as of the 39 Miscellaneous Lyrics and the 34 Lyrics and Reveries, all with their more serious side. These latter include such fine examples of philosophical meditation and contemporary observation as 'Wessex Heights' and 'Channel Firing'.

== Reception and influence ==
- The collection's initial reception was very muted, only Lytton Strachey pointing out how the writing had “the subtle disturbing force of poetry...the secret of touching our marrow-bones”.
- The subgroup 'Satires of Circumstance' have been singled out as a significant influence on and template for Siegfried Sassoon, and may also have influenced the early D. H. Lawrence.

== See also ==
- Edmund Blunden
- Georgian Poetry
