= Human Shows, Far Phantasies, Songs and Trifles =

- Author: Thomas Hardy
- Language: English
- Genre: Poetry
- Publisher: Macmillan and Co.
- Publication date: 1925
- Publication place: London, England, United Kingdom
- Media type: Hardcover
- Pages: 279
- OCLC: 4111234

Human Shows, Far Phantasies, Songs and Trifles is the penultimate collection of poems by English poet Thomas Hardy, and was published in 1925. A miscellaneous collection, Human Shows included old, new, and updated poems.

== Themes and tone ==
The most cheerful of Hardy's collections, Human Shows has been seen as reflecting something of an Indian summer on its author's part: he himself, in his introduction to Winter Words, feared that he had been “too liberal in selecting flippant, not to say farcical, pieces into the collection”. A pastoral tone prevails, often dramatising characters from Hardy's fiction, and at times Hardy even seems to burlesque some of his own tragic themes—of ironic accidents and patterned fate—as in the sketch "Snow in the Suburbs".

The collection includes more serious poems as well—memories of friends and family gone, as well as of his first wife Emma. "Alike and Unalike" records the beginning dissension in his marriage with his attachment to Florence Henniker; and "Nobody Comes" records his lonely wait for his second wife Florence Dugdale to return after an operation in London.

== See also ==
- Thomas Hardy's Wessex
