= Thomas Hardy =

English novelist and poet (1840–1928)

Thomas Hardy OM
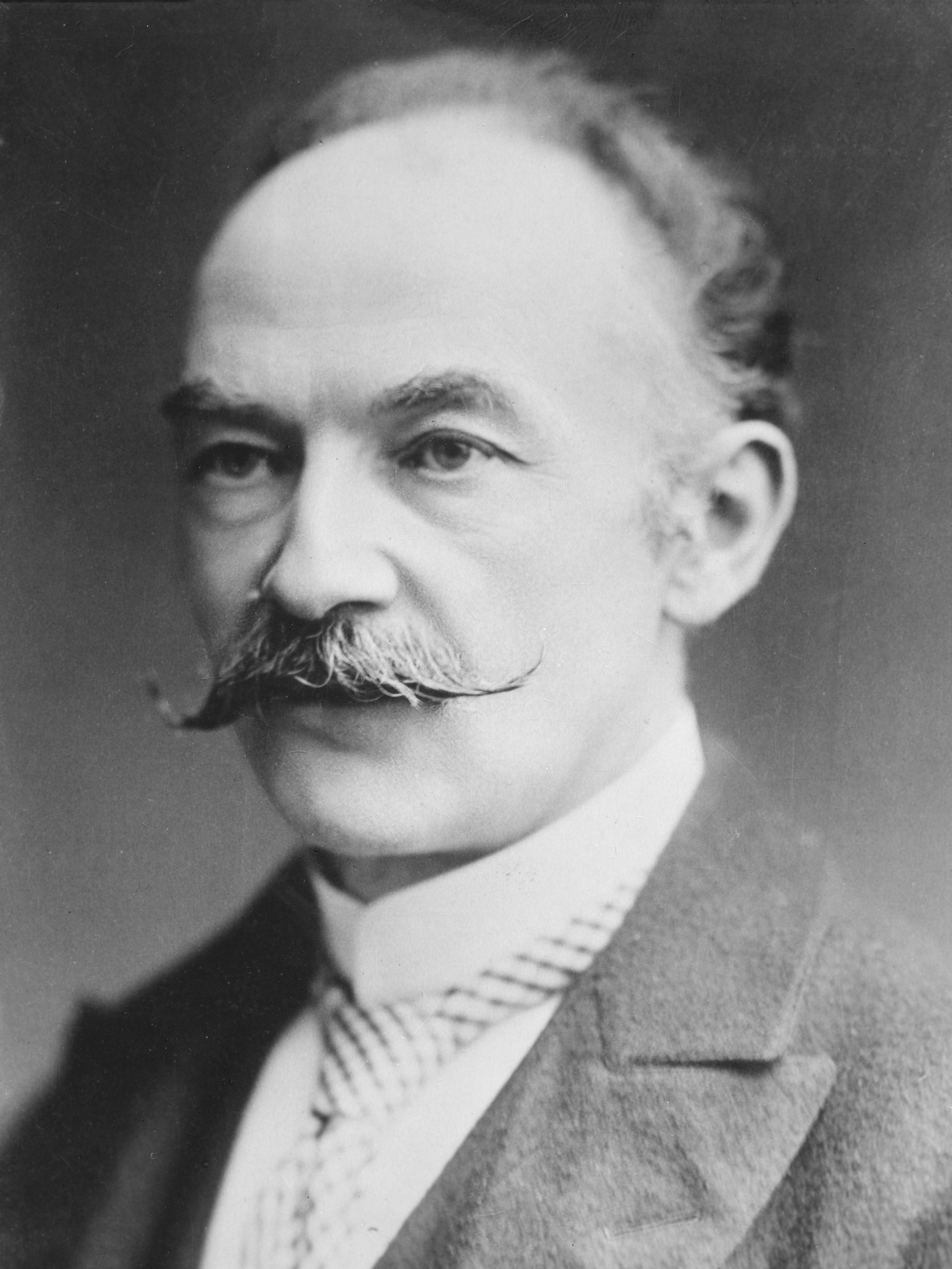
- Hardy, c. 1910–1915
- Born: 2 June 1840; Stinsford, Dorset, England
- Died: 11 January 1928 (aged 87); Dorchester, Dorset, England
- Resting place: Stinsford parish church (heart); Poets' Corner, Westminster Abbey (ashes)
- Education: King's College London
- Occupations: Novelist; poet; short story writer; architect
- Spouses: Emma Gifford (m. 1874; died 1912); Florence Dugdale (m. 1914)
- Writing career
- Notable works: Far from the Madding Crowd (1874); The Return of the Native (1878); The Mayor of Casterbridge (1886); Tess of the d'Urbervilles (1891); Jude the Obscure (1895)
- Movements: Naturalism; Victorian literature

Thomas Hardy (2 June 1840 – 11 January 1928) was an English novelist, poet and architect. A Victorian realist in the tradition of George Eliot, he was influenced both in his novels and in his poetry by Romanticism, including the poetry of William Wordsworth. He was highly critical of much in Victorian society, especially on the declining status of rural people in Britain such as those from his native South West England.

While Hardy wrote poetry throughout his life and regarded himself primarily as a poet, his first collection was not published until 1898. Initially, he gained fame as the author of novels such as Far from the Madding Crowd (1874), The Return of the Native (1878), The Mayor of Casterbridge (1886), Tess of the d'Urbervilles (1891) and Jude the Obscure (1895). During his lifetime, Hardy's poetry was acclaimed by younger poets (particularly the Georgians) who viewed him as a mentor. After his death his poems were lauded by Ezra Pound, W. H. Auden and Philip Larkin.

Many of his novels concern tragic characters struggling against their passions and social circumstances, and they are often set in the semi-fictional region of Wessex; initially based on the medieval Anglo-Saxon kingdom, Hardy's Wessex eventually came to include the counties of Dorset, Wiltshire, Somerset, Devon, Hampshire and much of Berkshire, in south-west and south central England. Two of his novels, Tess of the d'Urbervilles and Far from the Madding Crowd, were listed in the top 50 on the BBC's survey of best-loved novels, The Big Read.

== Life and career ==
=== Early life ===
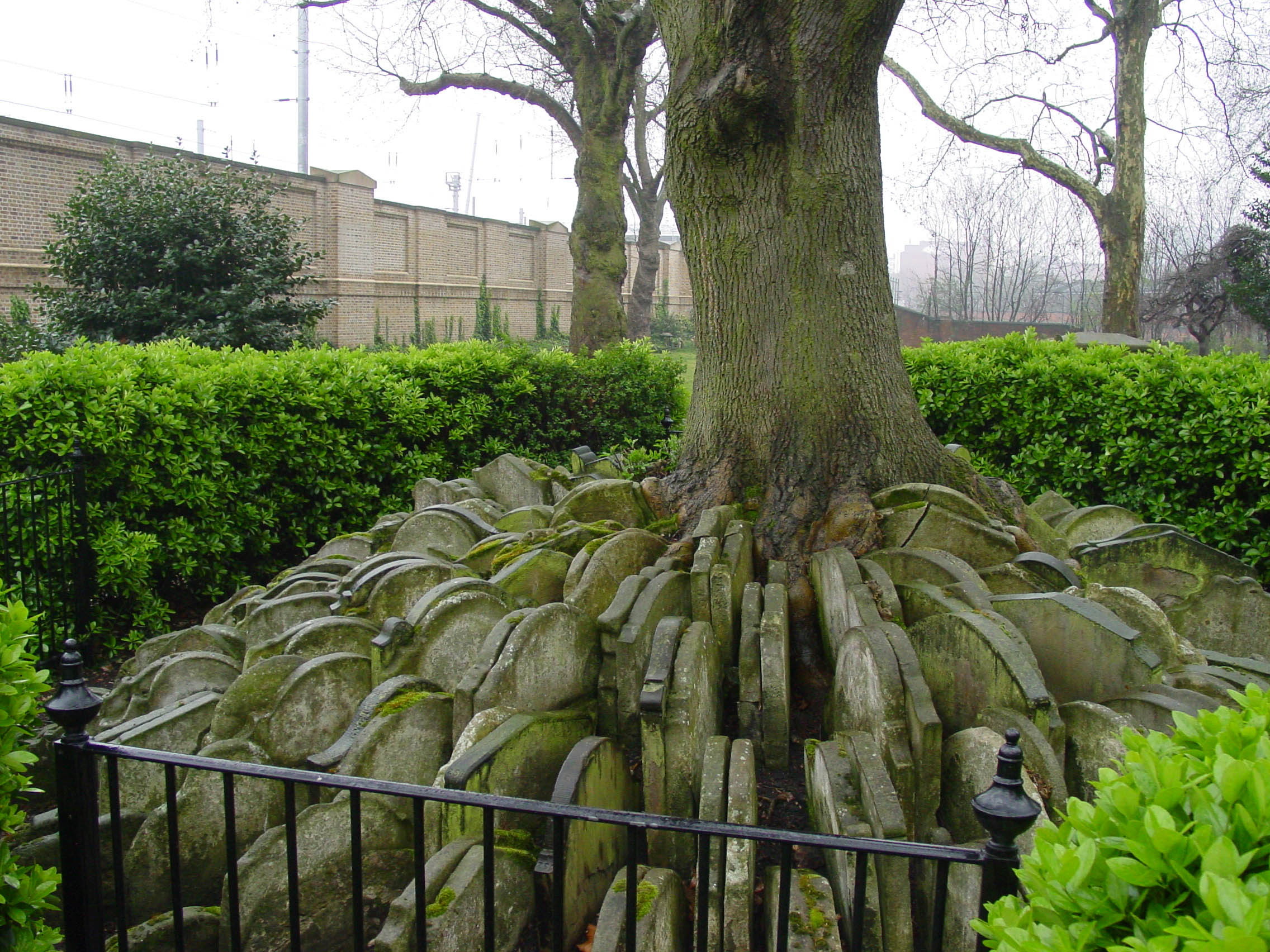
"The Hardy Tree", a Great Tree of London in Old St Pancras churchyard in London, growing between gravestones moved while Hardy was working there. The tree fell in December 2022.

Thomas Hardy was born on 2 June 1840 in Higher Bockhampton (then Upper Bockhampton), a hamlet in the parish of Stinsford to the east of Dorchester in Dorset, England, where his father Thomas (1811–1892) worked as a stonemason and local builder. His parents had married at Melbury Osmond on 22 December 1839. His mother, Jemima (née Hand; 1813–1904), was well read, and she educated Thomas until he went to his first school at Bockhampton at the age of eight. For several years, he attended Mr. Last's Academy for Young Gentlemen in Dorchester, where he learned Latin and demonstrated academic potential.

Because Hardy's family lacked the means for a university education, his formal education ended at the age of sixteen, when he became apprenticed to James Hicks, a local architect. He worked on the design of the new church at nearby Athelhampton, situated just opposite Athelhampton House where he painted a watercolour of the Tudor gatehouse while visiting his father, who was repairing the masonry of the dovecote.

In 1862 he moved to London, where he joined Arthur Blomfield's practice as assistant architect and worked with Blomfield on Christ Church, East Sheen (where the tower collapsed in 1863), and All Saints' parish church in Windsor, Berkshire, in 1862–64. A reredos, possibly designed by Hardy, was discovered behind panelling at All Saints' in August 2016. In the mid-1860s, Hardy was in charge of the excavation of part of the graveyard of St Pancras Old Church before its destruction when the Midland Railway was extended to a new terminus at St Pancras.

While in London, he enrolled in evening classes at King's College London. In 1862 he won a design prize from the Architectural Association, and in 1863 an essay prize from the Royal Institute of British Architects.

Hardy never felt at home in London, because he was acutely conscious of class divisions and his own feelings of social inferiority. During this time, he became interested in social reform and the works of John Stuart Mill. He was introduced by his Dorset friend Horace Moule to the works of Charles Fourier and Auguste Comte. Mill's essay On Liberty was one of Hardy's cures for despair, and in 1924 he declared that "my pages show harmony of view with" Mill. He was also attracted to Matthew Arnold's and Leslie Stephen's ideal of the urbane liberal freethinker.

After five years, concerned about his health, he returned to Dorset, where he initially returned to working for Hicks, and subsequently moved to the practice of G. R. Crickmay, a Weymouth architect.

=== Personal life ===
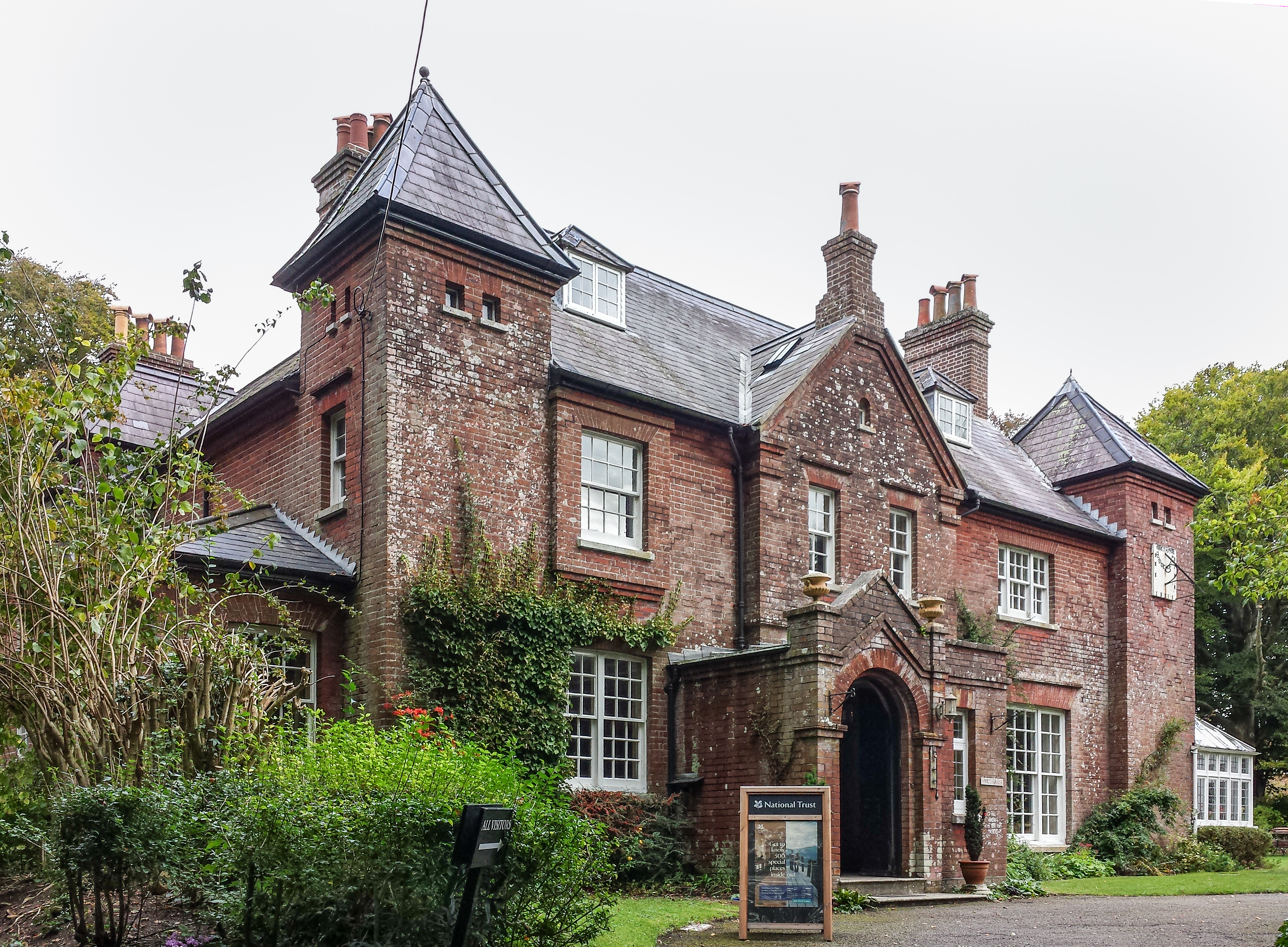
Max Gate in 2015

In 1870, while on an architectural mission to restore the parish church of St Juliot in Cornwall, Hardy met and fell in love with Emma Gifford, whom he married on 17 September 1874, at St Peter's Church, Paddington, London. The couple rented St David's Villa, Southborough (now Surbiton) for a year.

In 1885, they moved to Max Gate in Dorchester, a house designed by Hardy and built by his brother. Although later the couple became estranged, Emma's death in 1912 had a traumatic effect on him and Hardy made a trip to Cornwall after her death to revisit places linked with their courtship. His Poems of 1912–13 reflect upon her death. He remained preoccupied with his first wife's death and tried to overcome his remorse by writing poetry.

In 1914, Hardy married his secretary Florence Emily Dugdale, who was 39 years his junior.

In his later years, he kept a Wire Fox Terrier named Wessex, who was notoriously ill-tempered. Wessex's grave stone can be found on the Max Gate grounds.

In 1910 Hardy was appointed a Member of the Order of Merit and was also for the first time nominated for the Nobel Prize in Literature. He was nominated again for the prize 11 years later and by 1927 had received a total of 25 nominations. In 1923, he was one of the final candidates for the prize, but did not win.

=== Hardy and the theatre ===
Hardy's interest in the theatre dated from the 1860s. He corresponded with various would-be adapters over the years, including Robert Louis Stevenson in 1886 and Jack Grein and Charles Jarvis in the same decade. Neither adaptation came to fruition, but Hardy showed he was potentially enthusiastic about such a project. One play that was performed, however, caused him a certain amount of pain. His experience of the controversy and lukewarm critical reception that had surrounded his and Comyns Carr's adaptation of Far from the Madding Crowd in 1882 left him wary of the damage that adaptations could do to his literary reputation. So, in 1908, he so readily and enthusiastically became involved with a local amateur group, at the time known as the Dorchester Dramatic and Debating Society, but that would become the Hardy Players. His reservations about adaptations of his novels meant he was initially at some pains to disguise his involvement in the play. However, the international success of the play, The Trumpet Major, led to a long and successful collaboration between Hardy and the Players over the remaining years of his life. Indeed, his play The Famous Tragedy of the Queen of Cornwall at Tintagel in Lyonnesse (1923) was written to be performed by the Hardy Players.

=== Later years ===
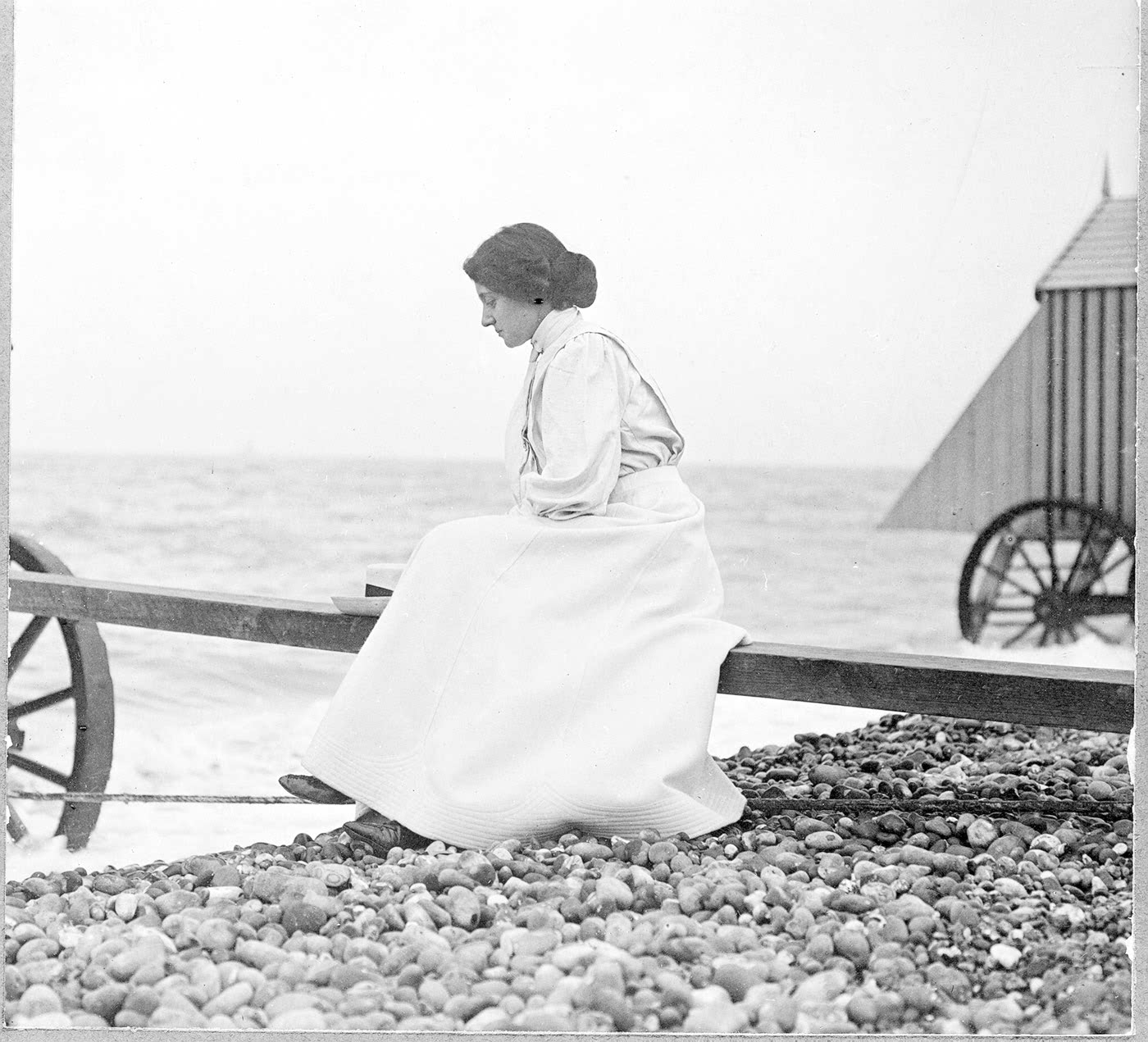
Florence Hardy at the seashore, 1915

From the 1880s, Hardy became increasingly involved in campaigns to save ancient buildings from destruction, or destructive modernisation, and he became an early member of the Society for the Protection of Ancient Buildings. His correspondence refers to his unsuccessful efforts to prevent major alterations to the parish church at Puddletown, close to his home at Max Gate. He became a frequent visitor at Athelhampton House, which he knew from his teenage years, and in his letters he encouraged the owner, Alfred Cart de Lafontaine, to conduct the restoration of that building in a sensitive way.

In 1914, Hardy was one of 53 leading British authors—including H. G. Wells, Rudyard Kipling and Sir Arthur Conan Doyle—who signed their names to the "Authors' Declaration", justifying Britain's involvement in the First World War. This manifesto declared that the German invasion of Belgium had been a brutal crime, and that Britain "could not without dishonour have refused to take part in the present war." Hardy was horrified by the destruction caused by the war, pondering that "I do not think a world in which such fiendishness is possible to be worth the saving" and "better to let western 'civilization' perish, and let the black and yellow races have a chance." He wrote to John Galsworthy that "the exchange of international thought is the only possible salvation for the world."

Shortly after helping to excavate the Fordington mosaic, Hardy became ill with pleurisy in December 1927 and died at Max Gate just after 9 pm on 11 January 1928, having dictated his final poem to his wife on his deathbed; the cause of death was cited, on his death certificate, as "cardiac syncope", with "old age" given as a contributory factor. His funeral was on 16 January at Westminster Abbey, and it proved a controversial occasion because Hardy had wished for his body to be interred at Stinsford church in the same grave as his first wife, Emma. His family and friends concurred; however, his executor, Sir Sydney Carlyle Cockerell, insisted that he be placed in the abbey's famous Poets' Corner. A compromise was reached whereby his heart was buried at Stinsford with Emma, and his ashes in Poets' Corner. Hardy's estate at death was valued at £95,418 (equivalent to £5,200,000 in 2025).

Shortly after Hardy's death, the executors of his estate burnt his letters and notebooks, but 12 notebooks survived, one of them containing notes and extracts of newspaper stories from the 1820s, and research into these has provided insight into how Hardy used them in his works. The opening chapter of The Mayor of Casterbridge, for example, written in 1886, was based on press reports of wife-selling. In the year of his death, Mrs Hardy published The Early Life of Thomas Hardy, 1841–1891, compiled largely from contemporary notes, letters, diaries and biographical memoranda, as well as from oral information in conversations extending over many years.

Hardy's work was admired by many younger writers, including D. H. Lawrence, John Cowper Powys and Virginia Woolf. In his autobiography Good-Bye to All That (1929), Robert Graves recalls meeting Hardy in Dorset in the early 1920s and how Hardy received him and his new wife warmly, and was encouraging about his work.

Hardy's birthplace in Bockhampton and his house Max Gate, both in Dorchester, are owned by the National Trust.

== Novels ==
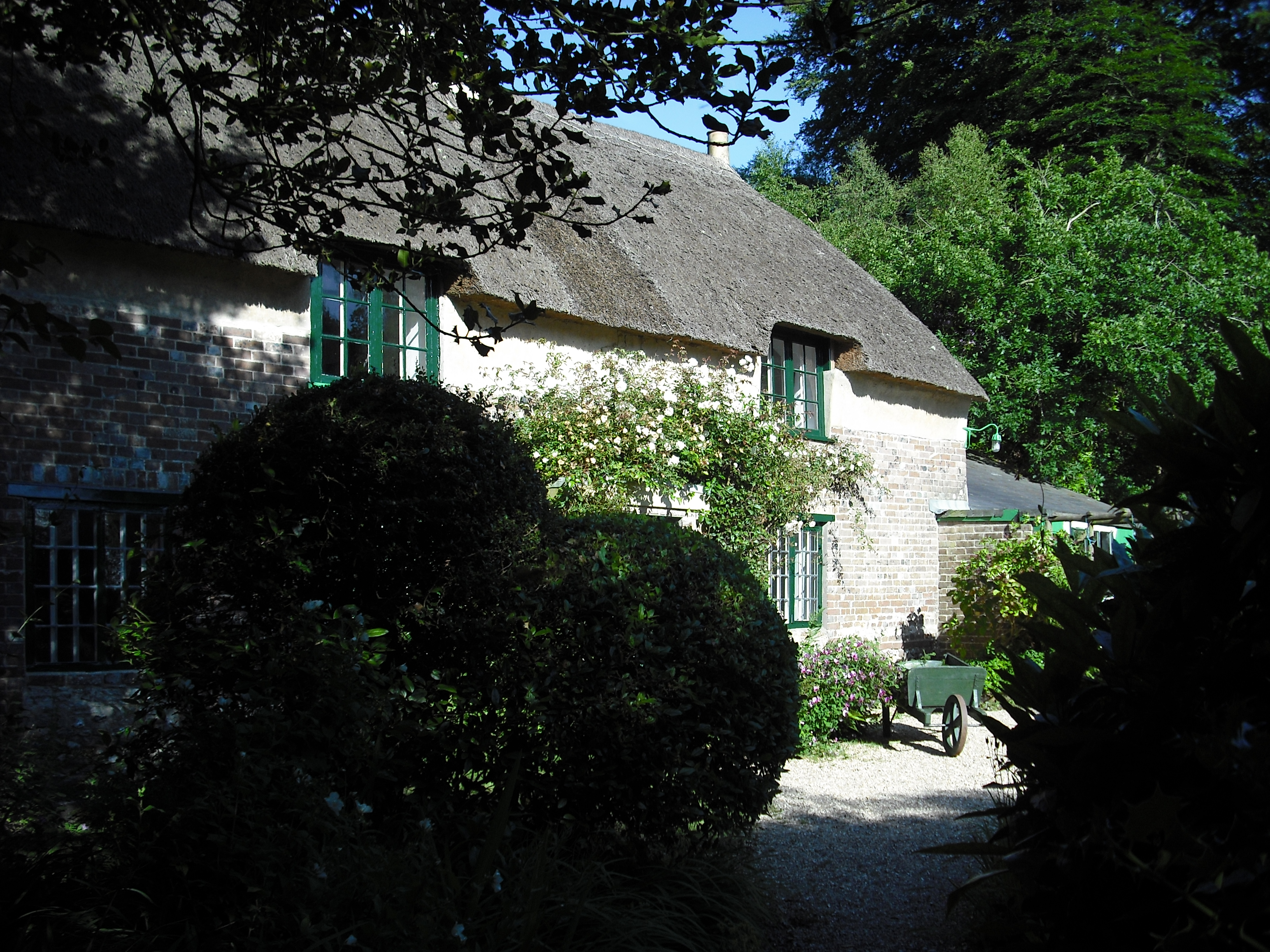
Thomas Hardy's birthplace and cottage at Higher Bockhampton, where Under the Greenwood Tree and Far from the Madding Crowd were written

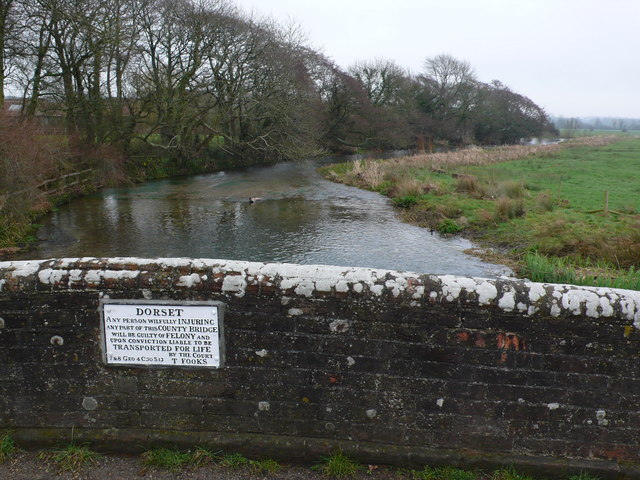
View of the River Frome from the bridge at Lower Bockhampton. In Tess of the d'Urbervilles the lowland vale of the river is described as the Vale of the Great Dairies, in comparison to Tess's home, the fertile Vale of Blackmore, which is the Vale of Little Dairies.

Hardy's first novel, The Poor Man and the Lady, finished by 1867, failed to find a publisher. He then showed it to his mentor and friend, the Victorian poet and novelist George Meredith, who felt that The Poor Man and the Lady would be too politically controversial and might damage Hardy's ability to publish in the future. So Hardy followed his advice and he did not try further to publish it. He subsequently destroyed the manuscript, but used some of the ideas in his later work. In his recollections in Life and Work, Hardy described the book as "socialistic, not to say revolutionary; yet not argumentatively so."

After he abandoned his first novel, Hardy wrote two new ones that he hoped would have more commercial appeal, Desperate Remedies (1871) and Under the Greenwood Tree (1872), both of which were published anonymously; it was while working on the latter that he met Emma Gifford, who would become his wife. In 1873 A Pair of Blue Eyes, a novel drawing on Hardy's courtship of Emma, was published under his own name. A plot device popularised by Charles Dickens, the term "cliffhanger" is considered to have originated with the serialised version of A Pair of Blue Eyes (published in Tinsley's Magazine between September 1872 and July 1873) in which Henry Knight, one of the protagonists, is left literally hanging off a cliff. Elements of Hardy's fiction reflect the influence of the commercially successful sensation fiction of the 1860s, particularly the legal complications in novels such as Desperate Remedies (1871), Far from the Madding Crowd (1874) and Two on a Tower (1882).

In Far from the Madding Crowd, Hardy first introduced the idea of calling the region in the west of England, where his novels are set, Wessex. Wessex had been the name of an early Saxon kingdom, in approximately the same part of England. Far from the Madding Crowd was successful enough for Hardy to give up architectural work and pursue a literary career. Over the next 25 years, Hardy produced 10 more novels.

Subsequently, Hardy moved from London to Yeovil, and then to Sturminster Newton, where he wrote The Hand of Ethelberta (1876) and The Return of the Native (1878). In 1880, Hardy published his only historical novel, The Trumpet-Major. The next year, in 1881, A Laodicean was published. A further move to Wimborne saw Hardy write Two on a Tower, published in 1882, a romance story set in the world of astronomy. Then in 1885, they moved for the last time, to Max Gate, a house outside Dorchester designed by Hardy and built by his brother. There he wrote The Mayor of Casterbridge (1886), The Woodlanders (1887) and Tess of the d'Urbervilles (1891), the last of which attracted criticism for its sympathetic portrayal of a "fallen woman", and initially it was refused publication. Its subtitle, A Pure Woman: Faithfully Presented, was intended to raise the eyebrows of the Victorian middle classes.

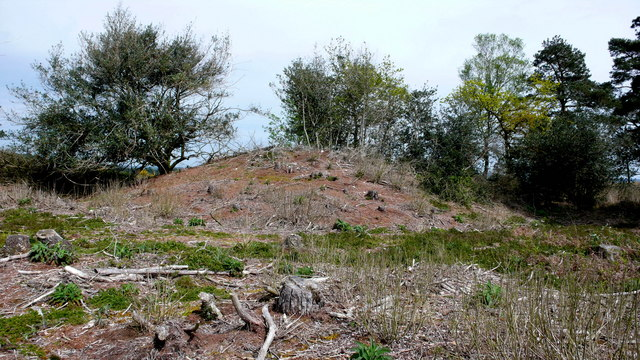
A major location of The Return of the Native as part of Hardy's fictional Egdon Heath

Jude the Obscure, published in 1895, was the last novel written by Hardy. It was met with an even stronger negative response from the Victorian public because of its controversial treatment of sex, religion and marriage. Its apparent attack on the institution of marriage caused strain on Hardy's already difficult marriage because Emma Hardy was concerned that Jude the Obscure would be read as autobiographical. Some booksellers sold the novel in brown paper bags, and Walsham How, the Bishop of Wakefield, is reputed to have burnt his copy. In his postscript of 1912, Hardy humorously referred to this incident as part of the career of the book: "After these [hostile] verdicts from the press its next misfortune was to be burnt by a bishop – probably in his despair at not being able to burn me". Despite this, Hardy had become a celebrity by the 1900s, but some argue that he gave up writing novels because of the criticism of both Tess of the d'Urbervilles and Jude the Obscure. However, in a March 1928 piece in the Bookman that posthumously printed interviews with Hardy, he is quoted as saying that, in addition to the negative publicity, he chose to stop writing novels because "I never cared very much about writing novels" and "I had written quite enough novels."

The Well-Beloved, first serialised in 1892 and written before Jude the Obscure, was the last of Hardy's fourteen novels to be published, in 1897.

== Literary themes ==
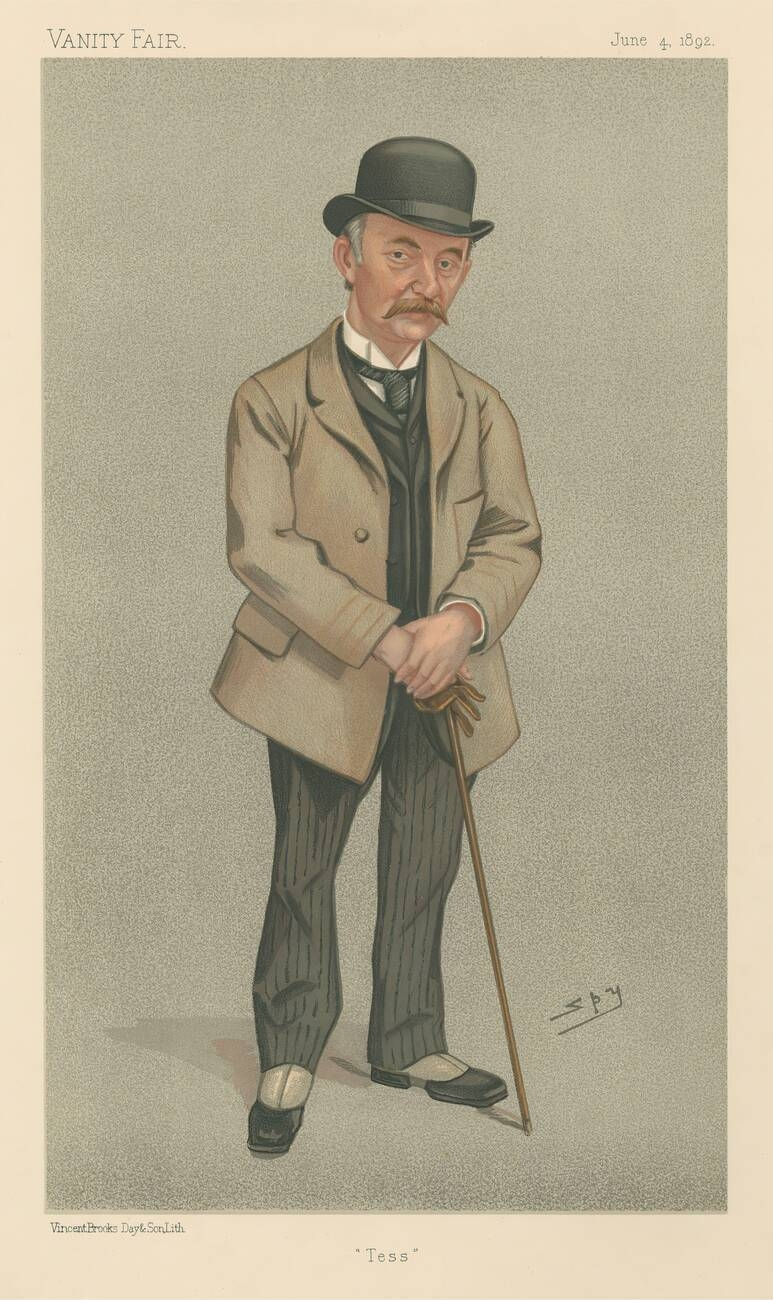
Caricature of Hardy in Vanity Fair, 4 June 1892

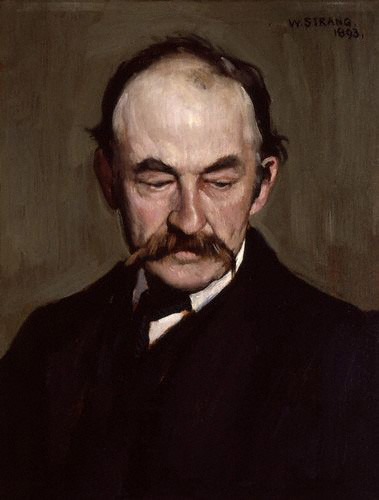
Hardy painted by William Strang, 1893

Considered a Victorian realist, Hardy examines the social constraints on the lives of those living in Victorian England, and criticises those beliefs, especially those relating to marriage, education and religion, that limited people's lives and caused unhappiness. Such unhappiness, and the suffering it brings, is seen by poet Philip Larkin as central in Hardy's works:

What is the intensely maturing experience of which Hardy's modern man is most sensible? In my view it is suffering, or sadness, and extended consideration of the centrality of suffering in Hardy's work should be the first duty of the true critic for which the work is still waiting [...] Any approach to his work, as to any writer's work, must seek first of all to determine what element is peculiarly his, which imaginative note he strikes most plangently, and to deny that in this case it is the sometimes gentle, sometimes ironic, sometimes bitter but always passive apprehension of suffering is, I think, wrong-headed.

In Two on a Tower, for example, Hardy takes a stand against these rules of society with a story of love that crosses the boundaries of class. The reader is forced to reconsider the conventions set up by society for the relationships between men and women. Nineteenth-century society had conventions, which were enforced. In this novel Swithin St Cleeve's idealism pits him against such contemporary social constraints.

In a novel structured around contrasts, the main opposition is between Swithin St Cleeve and Lady Viviette Constantine, who are presented as binary figures in a series of ways: aristocratic and lower class, youthful and mature, single and married, fair and dark, religious and agnostic...she [Lady Viviette Constantine] is also deeply conventional, absurdly wishing to conceal their marriage until Swithin has achieved social status through his scientific work, which gives rise to uncontrolled ironies and tragic-comic misunderstandings.

Fate or chance is another important theme. Hardy's characters often encounter crossroads on a journey, a junction that offers alternative physical destinations but which is also symbolic of a point of opportunity and transition, further suggesting that fate is at work. Far from the Madding Crowd is an example of a novel in which chance has a major role: "Had Bathsheba not sent the valentine, had Fanny not missed her wedding, for example, the story would have taken an entirely different path." Indeed, Hardy's main characters often seem to be held in fate's overwhelming grip.

== Poetry ==
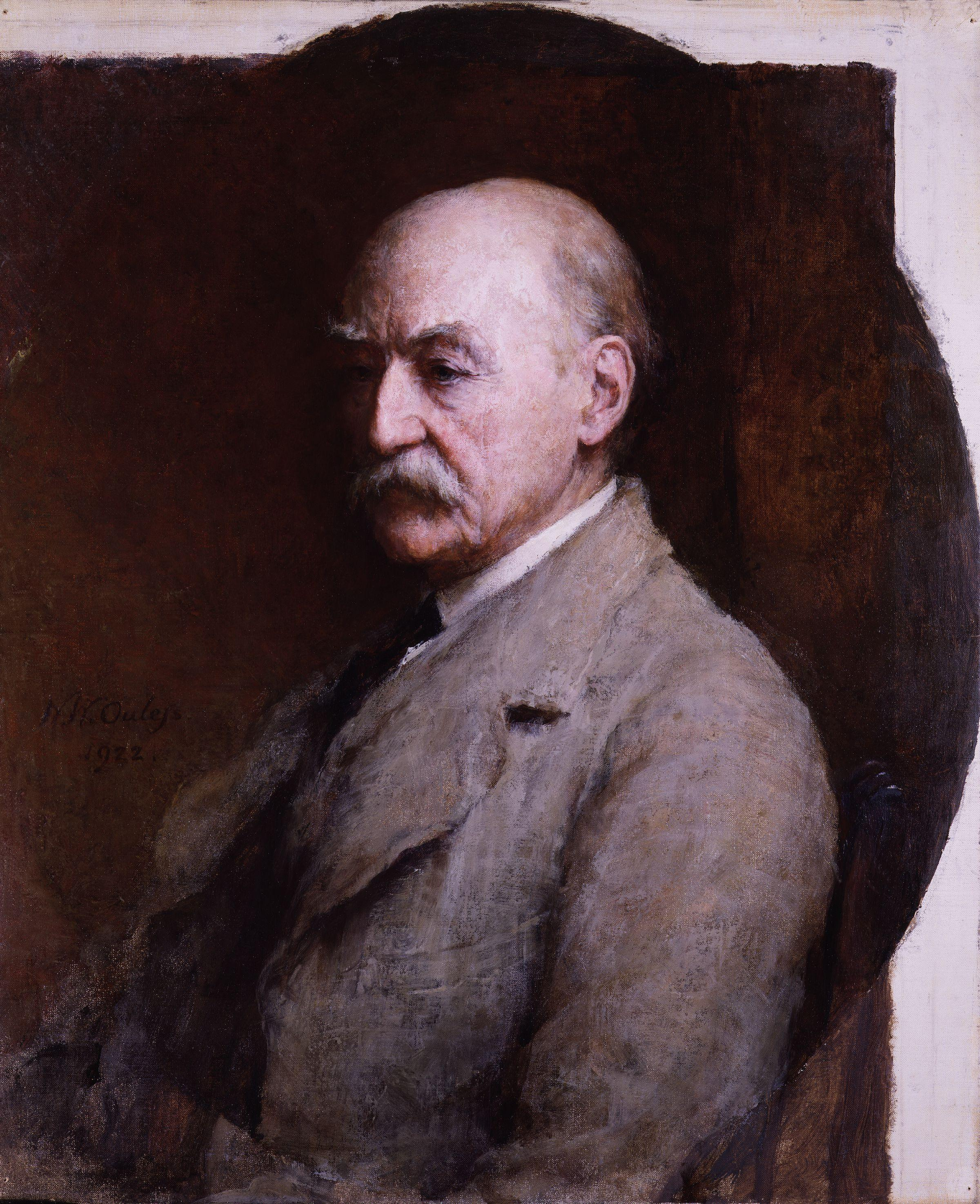
Thomas Hardy by Walter William Ouless, 1922

In 1898, Hardy published his first volume of poetry, Wessex Poems, a collection of poems written over 30 years. While some suggest that Hardy gave up writing novels following the harsh criticism of Jude the Obscure in 1896, the poet C. H. Sisson calls this "hypothesis" "superficial and absurd". In the twentieth century Hardy published only poetry.

He published Poems of the Past and the Present in 1901, which contains "The Darkling Thrush" (originally titled "The Century's End"), one of his best known poems about the turn of the century.

Hardy wrote in a great variety of poetic forms, including lyrics, ballads, satire, dramatic monologues and dialogue, as well as a three-volume epic closet drama The Dynasts (1904–08), and though in some ways a very traditional poet, because he was influenced by folksong and ballads, he "was never conventional," and "persistently experiment[ed] with different, often invented, stanza forms and metres," and made use of "rough-hewn rhythms and colloquial diction".

In a re-evaluation of The Dynasts in 2006, Keith Wilson wrote: "The Dynasts, this unusual work that allowed him [Hardy] to explore what he had noticed about human beings over the most ambitious canvas that he had ever attempted, should stand among his greatest achievements."

Hardy wrote a number of significant war poems that relate to both the Boer Wars and World War I, including "Drummer Hodge", "In Time of 'The Breaking of Nations'" and "The Man He Killed"; his work had a profound influence on other war poets such as Rupert Brooke and Siegfried Sassoon. Hardy in these poems often used the viewpoint of ordinary soldiers and their colloquial speech. A theme in the Wessex Poems is the long shadow that the Napoleonic Wars cast over the 19th century, as seen, for example, in "The Sergeant's Song" and "Leipzig". The Napoleonic War is the subject of The Dynasts.

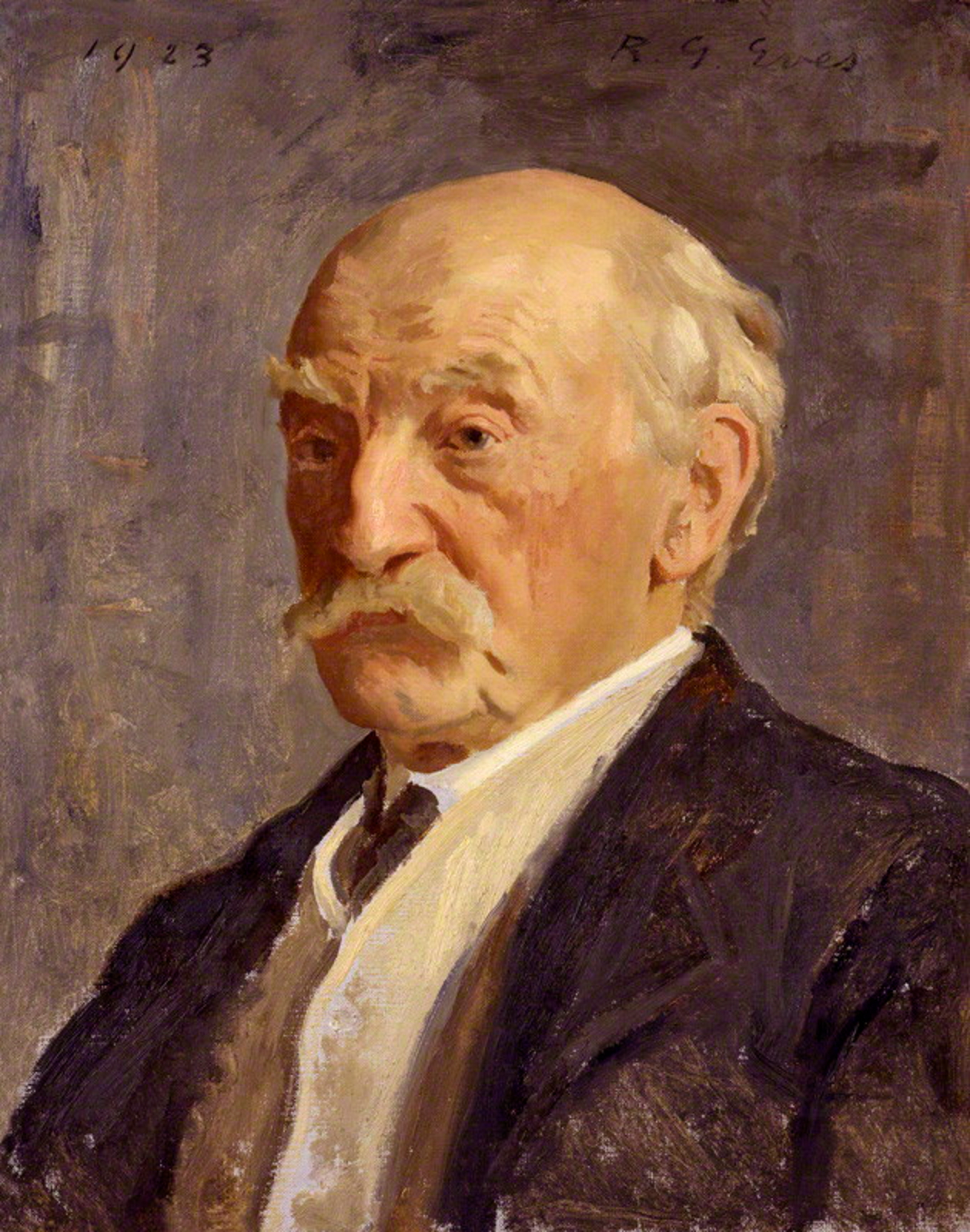
A portrait of Thomas Hardy in 1923 by Reginald Eves

Some of Hardy's more famous poems are from Poems 1912–13, which later became part of Satires of Circumstance (1914), written following the death of his wife Emma in 1912. They had been estranged for 20 years, and these lyric poems express deeply felt "regret and remorse". Poems like "After a Journey", "The Voice" and others from this collection "are by general consent regarded as the peak of his poetic achievement". In a 2007 biography on Hardy, Claire Tomalin argues that Hardy became a truly great English poet after the death of his first wife Emma, beginning with these elegies, which she describes as among "the finest and strangest celebrations of the dead in English poetry."

Many of Hardy's poems deal with themes of disappointment in love and life, and "the perversity of fate", presenting these themes with "a carefully controlled elegiac feeling". Irony is an important element in a number of Hardy's poems, including "The Man He Killed" and "Are You Digging on My Grave". A few of Hardy's poems, such as "The Blinded Bird", a melancholy polemic against the sport of vinkenzetting, reflect his firm stance against animal cruelty, exhibited in his antivivisectionist views and his membership in the Royal Society for the Prevention of Cruelty to Animals.

Although his poems were initially not as well received as his novels had been, Hardy is now recognised as one of the great poets of the 20th century, and his verse had a profound influence on later writers, including Robert Frost, W. H. Auden, Dylan Thomas and Philip Larkin. Larkin included 27 poems by Hardy compared with only nine by T. S. Eliot in his edition of The Oxford Book of Twentieth Century English Verse in 1973. There were fewer poems by W. B. Yeats. Poet-critic Donald Davie's Thomas Hardy and English Poetry considers Hardy's contribution to ongoing poetic tradition at length and in creative depth. Davie's friend Thom Gunn also wrote on Hardy and acknowledged his stature and example.

== Religious beliefs ==
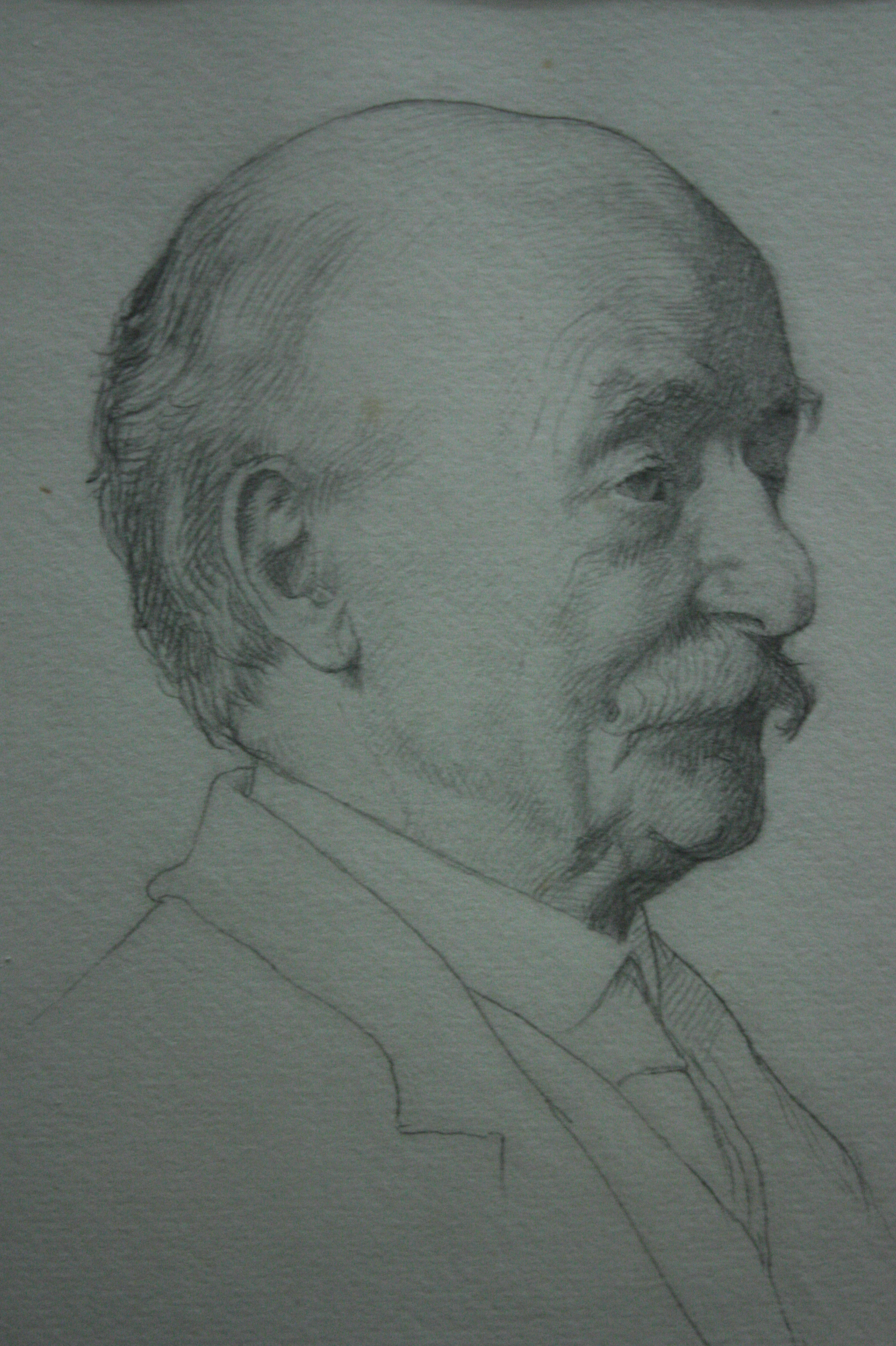
Thomas Hardy aged 70, by William Strang

Hardy's family was Anglican, but not especially devout. He was baptised at the age of five weeks and attended church, where his father and uncle contributed to music. He did not attend the local Church of England school, instead being sent to Mr Last's school, three miles away. As a young adult, he befriended Henry R. Bastow (a Plymouth Brethren man), who also worked as a pupil architect, and who was preparing for adult baptism in the Baptist Church. Hardy flirted with conversion, but decided against it. Bastow went to Australia and maintained a long correspondence with Hardy, but eventually Hardy tired of these exchanges and the correspondence ceased. This concluded Hardy's links with the Baptists.

The irony and struggles of life, coupled with his naturally curious mind, led him to question the traditional Christian view of God:

The Christian God – the external personality – has been replaced by the intelligence of the First Cause...the replacement of the old concept of God as all-powerful by a new concept of universal consciousness. The 'tribal god, man-shaped, fiery-faced and tyrannous' is replaced by the 'unconscious will of the Universe' which progressively grows aware of itself and 'ultimately, it is to be hoped, sympathetic'.

Scholars have debated Hardy's religious leanings for years, often unable to reach a consensus. Once, when asked in correspondence by a clergyman, Dr. A. B. Grosart, about the question of reconciling the horrors of human and animal life with "the absolute goodness and non-limitation of God", Hardy replied,

Mr. Hardy regrets that he is unable to offer any hypothesis which would reconcile the existence of such evils as Dr. Grosart describes with the idea of omnipotent goodness. Perhaps Dr. Grosart might be helped to a provisional view of the universe by the recently published Life of Darwin and the works of Herbert Spencer and other agnostics.

Hardy frequently conceived of, and wrote about, supernatural forces, particularly those that control the universe through indifference or caprice, a force he called The Immanent Will. He also showed in his writing some degree of fascination with ghosts and spirits. Even so, he retained a strong emotional attachment to the Christian liturgy and church rituals, particularly as manifested in rural communities, that had been such a formative influence in his early years, and Biblical references can be found woven throughout many of Hardy's novels. Hardy's friends during his apprenticeship to John Hicks included Horace Moule (one of the eight sons of Henry Moule) and the poet William Barnes, both ministers of religion. Moule remained a close friend of Hardy's for the rest of his life, and introduced him to new scientific findings that cast doubt on literal interpretations of the Bible, such as those of Gideon Mantell. Moule gave Hardy a copy of Mantell's book The Wonders of Geology (1848) in 1858, and Adelene Buckland has suggested that there are "compelling similarities" between the "cliffhanger" section from A Pair of Blue Eyes and Mantell's geological descriptions. It has also been suggested that the character of Henry Knight in A Pair of Blue Eyes was based on Horace Moule.

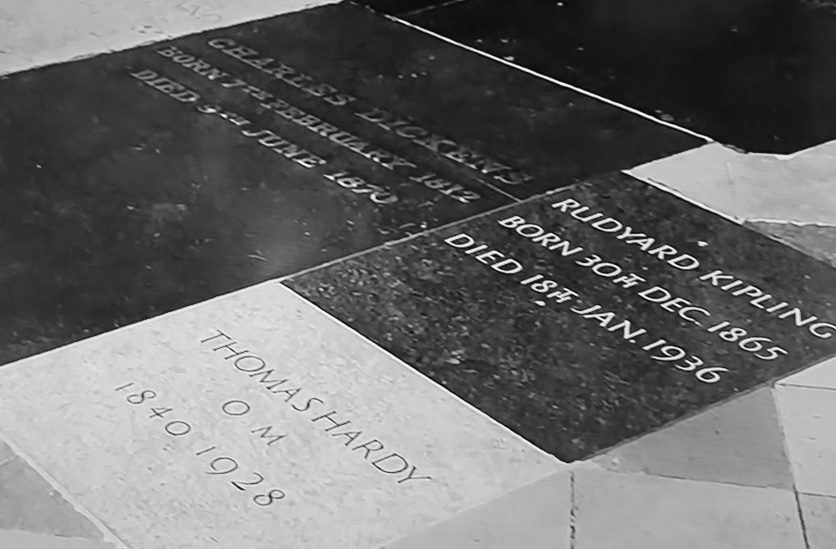
Grave of Thomas Hardy's ashes in Westminster Abbey (foreground, next to those of Rudyard Kipling and Charles Dickens)

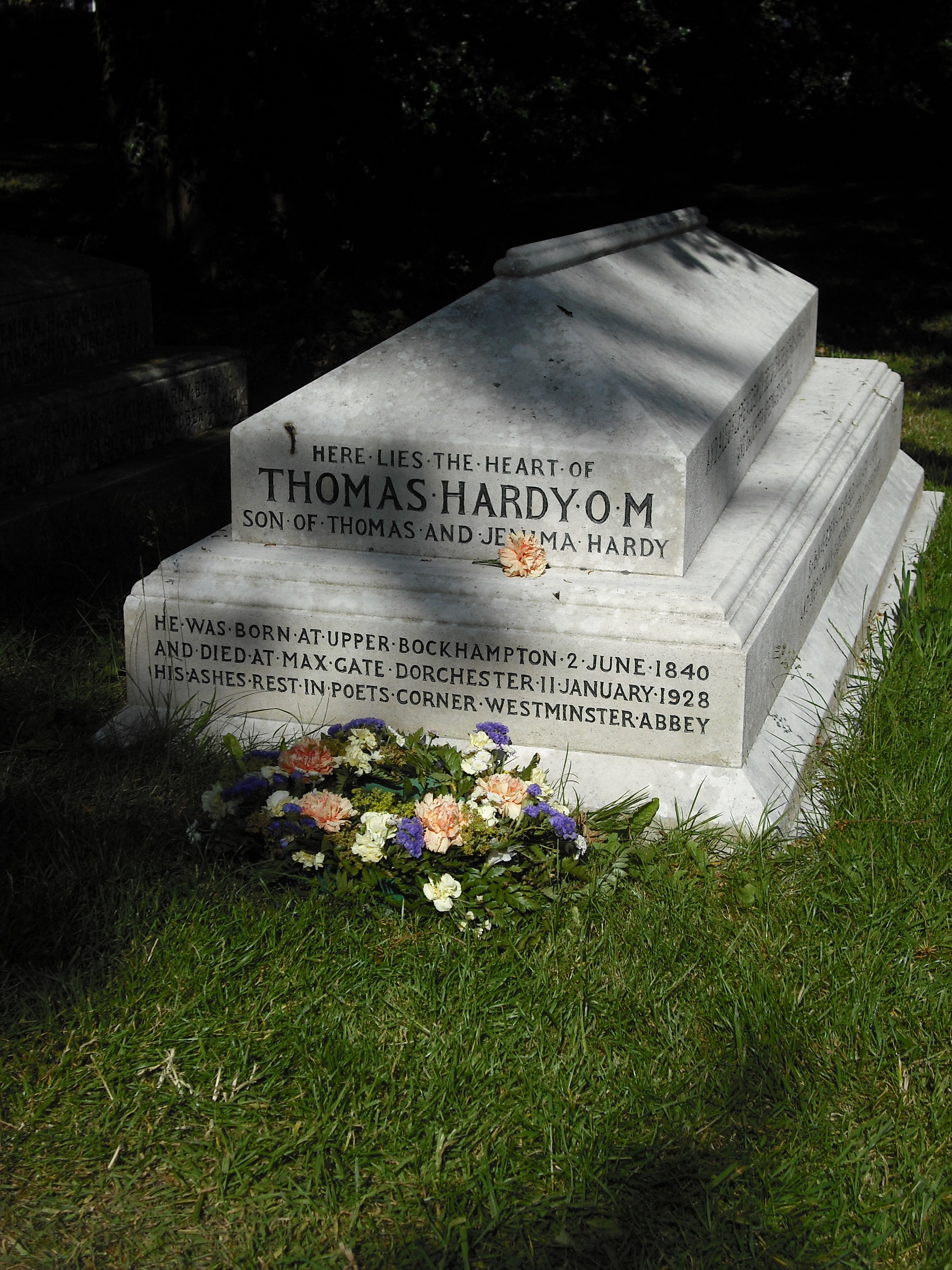
Grave of Thomas Hardy's heart at Stinsford parish church

Throughout his life, Hardy sought a rationale for believing in an afterlife or a timeless existence, turning first to spiritualists, such as Henri Bergson, and then to Albert Einstein and J. M. E. McTaggart, considering their philosophy on time and space in relation to immortality.

== Locations in novels ==
Sites associated with Hardy's own life and which inspired the settings of his novels continue to attract literary tourists and casual visitors. For locations in Hardy's novels see: Thomas Hardy's Wessex, and the Thomas Hardy's Wessex research site, which includes maps.

== Influence ==
Hardy corresponded with and visited Lady Catherine Milnes Gaskell at Wenlock Abbey and many of Lady Catherine's books are inspired by Hardy, who was very fond of her.

D. H. Lawrence's Study of Thomas Hardy (1914, first published 1936) indicates the importance of Hardy for him, even though this work is a platform for Lawrence's own developing philosophy rather than a more standard literary study. The influence of Hardy's treatment of character, and Lawrence's own response to the central metaphysic behind many of Hardy's novels, helped significantly in the development of The Rainbow (1915) and Women in Love (1920).

Wood and Stone (1915), the first novel by John Cowper Powys, who was a contemporary of Lawrence, was "Dedicated with devoted admiration to the greatest poet and novelist of our age Thomas Hardy". Powys's later novel Maiden Castle (1936) is set in Dorchester, which was Hardy's Casterbridge, and was intended by Powys to be a "rival" to Hardy's The Mayor of Casterbridge. Maiden Castle is the last of Powys's so-called Wessex novels, Wolf Solent (1929), A Glastonbury Romance (1932) and Weymouth Sands (1934), which are set in Somerset and Dorset.

Hardy was clearly the starting point for the character of the novelist Edward Driffield in W. Somerset Maugham's novel Cakes and Ale (1930). Thomas Hardy's works also feature prominently in the American playwright Christopher Durang's The Marriage of Bette and Boo (1985), in which a graduate thesis analysing Tess of the d'Urbervilles is interspersed with analysis of Matt's family's neuroses.

=== Musical settings ===
A number of notable English composers, including Gerald Finzi, Benjamin Britten, Ralph Vaughan Williams and Gustav Holst set poems by Hardy to music. Others include Holst's daughter Imogen Holst, John Ireland, Muriel Herbert, Ivor Gurney and Robin Milford. Orchestral tone poems which evoke the landscape of Hardy's novels include Ireland's Mai-Dun (1921) and Holst's Egdon Heath: A Homage to Thomas Hardy (1927).

Hardy has been a significant influence on Nigel Blackwell, frontman of the post-punk British rock band Half Man Half Biscuit, who has often incorporated phrases (some obscure) by or about Hardy into his song lyrics.

== Works ==
=== Prose ===
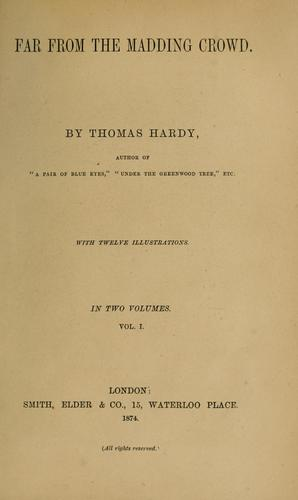
The title page from a first edition of Far from the Madding Crowd (1874)

In 1912, Hardy divided his novels and collected short stories into three classes:

==== Novels of character and environment ====
- The Poor Man and the Lady (1867, unpublished and lost)
- Under the Greenwood Tree: A Rural Painting of the Dutch School (1872)
- Far from the Madding Crowd (1874)
- The Return of the Native (1878)
- The Mayor of Casterbridge: The Life and Death of a Man of Character (1886)
- The Woodlanders (1887)
- Wessex Tales (1888, a collection of short stories)
- Tess of the d'Urbervilles: A Pure Woman Faithfully Presented (1891)
- Life's Little Ironies (1894, a collection of short stories)
- Jude the Obscure (1895)

==== Romances and fantasies ====
- A Pair of Blue Eyes: A Novel (1873)
- The Trumpet-Major (1880)
- Two on a Tower: A Romance (1882)
- A Group of Noble Dames (1891, a collection of short stories)
- The Well-Beloved: A Sketch of a Temperament (1897, first published as a serial from 1892)

==== Novels of ingenuity ====
- Desperate Remedies: A Novel (1871)
- The Hand of Ethelberta: A Comedy in Chapters (1876)
- A Laodicean: A Story of To-day (1881)

==== Mixed ====
- A Changed Man and Other Tales (1913, a collection of short stories that had appeared in periodicals between 1881 and 1900)

Hardy's first thought was to place the previously uncollected stories of A Changed Man — published after he had established his tripartite classification — in the "Novels of ingenuity" group. Later correspondence suggested it might belong in the "Romances and fantasies" group. In the end, he proposed creating a fourth "Mixed" group to better reflect the heterogeneity of the stories, to avoid complicating the volume-numbering of the Wessex Edition, and to "cover any volume of future sweepings from magazines".

==== Other ====
Hardy also produced other tales. One story, "The Spectre of the Real" (1894), was written in collaboration with Florence Henniker. Ten stories that were never published in volumes during Hardy's lifetime have been gathered together and published as The Excluded and Collaborative Stories by Hardy scholar Pamela Dalziel. His works have been collected as the 24-volume Wessex Edition (1912–13) and the 37-volume Mellstock Edition (1919–20). His largely self-written biography appears under his second wife's name in two volumes from 1928 to 1930, as The Early Life of Thomas Hardy, 1840–91 and The Later Years of Thomas Hardy, 1892–1928, now published in a critical one-volume edition as The Life and Work of Thomas Hardy, edited by Michael Millgate (1984).

==== Short stories ====
(with date of first publication)

- "How I Built Myself a House" (1865)
- "Destiny and a Blue Cloak" (1874)
- "The Thieves Who Couldn't Stop Sneezing" (1877)
- "The Duchess of Hamptonshire" (1878) (collected in A Group of Noble Dames)
- "An Indiscretion in the Life of an Heiress" (1878)
- "The Distracted Preacher" (1879) (collected in Wessex Tales)
- "Fellow-Townsmen" (1880) (collected in Wessex Tales)
- "The Honourable Laura" (1881) (collected in A Group of Noble Dames)
- "What the Shepherd Saw" (1881) (collected in A Changed Man and Other Tales)
- "A Tradition of Eighteen Hundred and Four" (1882) (collected in Life's Little Ironies)
- "The Three Strangers" (1883) (collected in Wessex Tales)
- "The Romantic Adventures of a Milkmaid" (1883) (collected in A Changed Man and Other Tales)
- "Interlopers at the Knap" (1884) (collected in Wessex Tales)
- "A Mere Interlude" (1885) (collected in A Changed Man and Other Tales)
- "A Tryst at an Ancient Earthwork" (1885) (collected in A Changed Man and Other Tales)
- "Alicia's Diary" (1887) (collected in A Changed Man and Other Tales)
- "The Waiting Supper" (1887–88) (collected in A Changed Man and Other Tales)
- "The Withered Arm" (1888) (collected in Wessex Tales)
- "A Tragedy of Two Ambitions" (1888) (collected in Life's Little Ironies)
- "The First Countess of Wessex" (1889) (collected in A Group of Noble Dames)
- "Anna, Lady Baxby" (1890) (collected in A Group of Noble Dames)
- "The Lady Icenway" (1890) (collected in A Group of Noble Dames)
- "Lady Mottisfont" (1890) (collected in A Group of Noble Dames)
- "The Lady Penelope" (1890) (collected in A Group of Noble Dames)
- "The Marchioness of Stonehenge" (1890) (collected in A Group of Noble Dames)
- "Squire Petrick's Lady" (1890) (collected in A Group of Noble Dames)
- "Barbara of the House of Grebe" (1890) (collected in A Group of Noble Dames)
- "The Melancholy Hussar of The German Legion" (1890) (collected in Life's Little Ironies)
- "Absent-Mindedness in a Parish Choir" (1891) (collected in Life's Little Ironies)
- "The Winters and the Palmleys" (1891) (collected in Life's Little Ironies)
- "For Conscience' Sake" (1891) (collected in Life's Little Ironies)
- "Incident in the Life of Mr. George Crookhill" (1891) (collected in Life's Little Ironies)
- "The Doctor's Legend" (1891)
- "Andrey Satchel and the Parson and Clerk" (1891) (collected in Life's Little Ironies)
- "The History of the Hardcomes" (1891) (collected in Life's Little Ironies)
- "Netty Sargent's Copyhold" (1891) (collected in Life's Little Ironies)
- "On the Western Circuit" (1891) (collected in Life's Little Ironies)
- "A Few Crusted Characters" (1891) (collected in Life's Little Ironies)
- "The Superstitious Man's Story" (1891) (collected in Life's Little Ironies)
- "Tony Kytes, the Arch-Deceiver" (1891) (collected in Life's Little Ironies)
- "To Please His Wife" (1891) (collected in Life's Little Ironies)
- "The Son's Veto" (1891) (collected in Life's Little Ironies)
- "Old Andrey's Experience as a Musician" (1891) (collected in Life's Little Ironies)
- "Our Exploits At West Poley" (1892–93)
- "Master John Horseleigh, Knight" (1893) (collected in A Changed Man and Other Tales)
- "The Fiddler of the Reels" (1893) (collected in Life's Little Ironies)
- "An Imaginative Woman" (1894) (collected in Wessex Tales, 1896 edition)
- "The Spectre of the Real" (1894)
- "A Committee-Man of 'The Terror'" (1896) (collected in A Changed Man and Other Tales)
- "The Duke's Reappearance" (1896) (collected in A Changed Man and Other Tales)
- "The Grave by the Handpost" (1897) (collected in A Changed Man and Other Tales)
- "A Changed Man" (1900) (collected in A Changed Man and Other Tales)
- "Enter a Dragoon" (1900) (collected in A Changed Man and Other Tales)
- "Blue Jimmy: The Horse Stealer" (1911)
- "Old Mrs. Chundle" (1929)
- "The Unconquerable" (1992)

=== Poetry collections ===
- Wessex Poems and Other Verses (1898)
- Poems of the Past and the Present (1901)
- Time's Laughingstocks and Other Verses (1909)
- Satires of Circumstance (1914)
- Moments of Vision (1917)
- Collected Poems (1919)
- Late Lyrics and Earlier with Many Other Verses (1922)
- Human Shows, Far Phantasies, Songs and Trifles (1925)
- Winter Words in Various Moods and Metres (1928)
- The Complete Poems (Macmillan, 1976)
- The Complete Poetical Works of Thomas Hardy, Volumes I–V (Edited by Samuel Hynes, OUP, 1983–1995)
- Selected Poems (edited by Harry Thomas, Penguin, 1993)
- Hardy: Poems (Everyman's Library Pocket Poets, 1995)
- Thomas Hardy: Selected Poetry and Nonfictional Prose (St. Martin's Press, 1996)
- Selected Poems (edited by Robert Mezey, Penguin, 1998)
- Thomas Hardy: The Complete Poems (Edited by James Gibson, Palgrave, 2001)

Online poems: Poems by Thomas Hardy at Poetry Foundation and Poems by Thomas Hardy at poemhunter.com

=== Drama ===
- The Dynasts: An Epic-Drama of the War with Napoleon (verse drama)
  - The Dynasts, Part 1 (1904)
  - The Dynasts, Part 2 (1906)
  - The Dynasts, Part 3 (1908)
- The Famous Tragedy of the Queen of Cornwall at Tintagel in Lyonnesse (1923) (one-act play)

=== Correspondence ===
- The Collected Letters of Thomas Hardy, Volumes I–VIII (OUP, 1978–2012)

=== Notebooks ===
- The Architectural Notebook of Thomas Hardy (Dorset Natural History & Archaeological Society, 1966, rev. ed. 2007)
- The Personal Notebooks of Thomas Hardy (contains the two "Memoranda" notebooks, the "Schools of Painting" notebook, and the "Trumpet-Major" notebook) (Macmillan, 1979)
- The Literary Notebooks of Thomas Hardy, Volumes I–II (contains the three "Literary Notes" notebooks and the "1867"' notebook) (Macmillan, 1985)
- Thomas Hardy's 'Studies, Specimens &c.' Notebook (OUP, 1994)
- Thomas Hardy's 'Facts' Notebook: A Critical Edition (Ashgate, 2004)
- The 'Poetical Matter' Notebook (unpublished; only survives in microfilm at Beinecke Rare Book & Manuscript Library)

== Biographies and criticism ==
- Armstrong, Tim. "Player Piano: Poetry and Sonic Modernity" in Modernism/Modernity 14.1 (January 2007), 1–19.
- Beatty, Claudius J. P. Thomas Hardy: Conservation Architect. His Work for the Society for the Protection of Ancient Buildings. Dorset Natural History and Archaeological Society 1995. ISBN 0-900341-44-0
- Blunden, Edmund. Thomas Hardy. New York: St. Martin's, 1942.
- Brady, Kristen. The Short Stories of Thomas Hardy. London: Macmillan, 1982.
- Boumelha, Penny. Thomas Hardy and Women. New Jersey: Barnes and Noble, 1982.
- Brennecke, Jr., Ernest. The Life of Thomas Hardy. New York: Greenberg, 1925.
- Cecil, Lord David. Hardy the Novelist. London: Constable, 1943.
- D'Agnillo, Renzo, "Music and Metaphor in Under the Greenwood Tree, in The Thomas Hardy Journal, 9, 2 (May 1993), pp. 39–50.
- D'Agnillo, Renzo, "Between Belief and Non-Belief: Thomas Hardy’s 'The Shadow on the Stone'", in Thomas Hardy, Francesco Marroni and Norman Page (eds), Pescara, Edizioni Tracce, 1995, pp. 197–222.
- Deacon, Lois and Terry Coleman. Providence and Mr. Hardy. London: Hutchinson, 1966.
- Draper, Jo. Thomas Hardy: A Life in Pictures. Wimborne, Dorset: The Dovecote Press.
- Ellman, Richard, & O'Clair, Robert (eds), 1988. "Thomas Hardy" in The Norton Anthology of Modern Poetry, New York: Norton.
- Gatrell, Simon. Hardy the Creator: A Textual Biography. Oxford: Clarendon, 1988.
- Gibson, James. Thomas Hardy: A Literary Life. London: Macmillan, 1996.
- Gibson, James. Thomas Hardy: Interviews and Recollections. London: Macmillan, 1999; New York: St Martin's Press, 1999.
- Gittings, Robert. Thomas Hardy's Later Years. Boston: Little, Brown, 1978.
- Gittings, Robert. Young Thomas Hardy. Boston : Little, Brown, 1975.
- Gittings, Robert and Jo Manton. The Second Mrs Hardy. London: Heinemann, 1979.
- Gossin, P. Thomas Hardy's Novel Universe: Astronomy, Cosmology, and Gender in the Post-Darwinian World. Aldershot: Ashgate, 2007 (The Nineteenth Century Series).
- Halliday, F. E. Thomas Hardy: His Life and Work. Bath: Adams & Dart, 1972.
- Hands, Timothy. Thomas Hardy : Distracted Preacher? : Hardy's religious biography and its influence on his novels. New York: St. Martin's Press, 1989.
- Hardy, Evelyn. Thomas Hardy: A Critical Biography. London: Hogarth Press, 1954.
- Hardy, Florence Emily. The Early Life of Thomas Hardy, 1840–1891. London: Macmillan, 1928.
- Hardy, Florence Emily. The Later Years of Thomas Hardy, 1892–1928. London: Macmillan, 1930.
- Harvey, Geoffrey. Thomas Hardy: The Complete Critical Guide to Thomas Hardy. New York: Routledge (Taylor & Francis Group), 2003.
- Hawkins, Desmond. Thomas Hardy. London: Arthur Barker, 1950. (The English Novelists series)
- Hedgcock, F. A., Thomas Hardy: penseur et artiste. Paris: Librairie Hachette, 1911.
- Holland, Clive. Thomas Hardy O.M.: The Man, His Works and the Land of Wessex. London: Herbert Jenkins, 1933.
- Jedrzejewski, Jan. Thomas Hardy and the Church. London: Macmillan, 1996.
- Johnson, Lionel Pigot. The Art of Thomas Hardy (London: E. Mathews, 1894).
- Kay-Robinson, Denys. The First Mrs Thomas Hardy. London: Macmillan, 1979.
- Langbaum, Robert. "Thomas Hardy in Our Time. New York: St. Martin's Press, 1995, London: Macmillan, 1997.
- Marroni, Francesco, "The Negation of Eros in 'Barbara of the House of Grebe' ", in Thomas Hardy Journal, 10, 1 (February 1994) pp. 33–41
- Marroni, Francesco and Norman Page (eds.), Thomas Hardy. Pescara: Edizioni Tracce, 1995.
- Marroni, Francesco, La poesia di Thomas Hardy. Bari: Adriatica Editrice, 1997.
- Marroni, Francesco, "The Poetry of Ornithology in Keats, Leopardi, and Hardy: A Dialogic Analysis", in "Thomas Hardy Journal", 14, 2 (May 1998) pp. 35–44
- Millgate, Michael (ed.). The Life and Work of Thomas Hardy by Thomas Hardy. London: Macmillan, 1984.
- Millgate, Michael. Thomas Hardy: A Biography. New York: Random House, 1982.
- Millgate, Michael. Thomas Hardy: A Biography Revisited.Oxford: Oxford University Press, 2004.
- Morgan, Rosemarie, (ed.) The Ashgate Research Companion to Thomas Hardy (Ashgate Publishing), 2010.
- Morgan, Rosemarie, (ed.) The Hardy Review,(Maney Publishing), 1999–.
- Morgan, Rosemarie, Student Companion to Thomas Hardy (Greenwood Press), 2006.
- Morgan, Rosemarie, Cancelled Words: Rediscovering Thomas Hardy (Routledge, Chapman & Hall),1992
- Morgan, Rosemarie, Women and Sexuality in the Novels of Thomas Hardy (Routledge & Kegan Paul), 1988; paperback: 1990.
- Musselwhite, David, Social Transformations in Hardy's Tragic Novels: Megamachines and Phantasms, Palgrave Macmillan, 2003.
- Norman, Andrew. Behind the Mask, History Press, 2011. ISBN 978-0-7524-5630-0
- O'Sullivan, Timothy. Thomas Hardy: An Illustrated Biography. London: Macmillan, 1975.
- Orel, Harold. The Final Years of Thomas Hardy, 1912–1928. Lawrence: University Press of Kansas, 1976.
- Orel, Harold. The Unknown Thomas Hardy. New York: St. Martin's, 1987.
- Page, Norman, ed. Oxford Reader's Companion to Hardy. Oxford University Press, 2000.
- Page, Norman, ed. Thomas Hardy Annual. No. 1: 1982; No. 2: 1984; No. 3: 1985; No. 4: 1986; No. 5; 1987. London: Macmillan, 1982–1987.
- Phelps, Kenneth. The Wormwood Cup: Thomas Hardy in Cornwall. Padstow: Lodenek Press, 1975.
- Pinion, F. B. Thomas Hardy: His Life and Friends. London: Palgrave, 1992.
- Pite, Ralph. Thomas Hardy: The Guarded Life. London: Picador, 2006.
- Saxelby, F. Outwin. A Thomas Hardy dictionary: the characters and scenes of the novels and poems alphabetically arranged and described (London: G. Routledge, 1911).
- Seymour-Smith, Martin. Hardy. London: Bloomsbury, 1994.
- Stevens-Cox, J. Thomas Hardy: Materials for a Study of his Life, Times, and Works. St. Peter Port, Guernsey: Toucan Press, 1968.
- Stevens-Cox, J. Thomas Hardy: More Materials for a Study of his Life, Times, and Works. St. Peter Port, Guernsey: Toucan Press, 1971.
- Stewart, J. I. M. Thomas Hardy: A Critical Biography. New York: Dodd, Mead & Co., 1971.
- Taylor, Richard H. The Neglected Hardy: Thomas Hardy's Lesser Novels. London: Macmillan; New York: St Martin's Press, 1982.
- Taylor, Richard H., ed. The Personal Notebooks of Thomas Hardy. London: Macmillan, 1979.
- Tomalin, Claire. Thomas Hardy/ New York: Penguin Press, 2006.
- Turner, Paul. The Life of Thomas Hardy: A Critical Biography. Oxford: Blackwell, 1998.
- Weber, Carl J. Hardy of Wessex, His Life and Literary Career. New York: Columbia University Press, 1940.
- Wilson, Keith. Thomas Hardy on Stage. London: Macmillan, 1995.
- Wilson, Keith, ed. Thomas Hardy Reappraised: Essays in Honour of Michael Millgate. Toronto: University of Toronto Press, 2006.
- Wilson, Keith, ed. A Companion to Thomas Hardy. Wiley-Blackwell, 2009.
- Wotton, George. Thomas Hardy: Towards A Materialist Criticism. Lanham: Rowman & Littlefield, 1985.
