= Our Exploits At West Poley =

Our Exploits At West Poley, subtitled "a story for boys", is a short story by Thomas Hardy. Written in 1883, and the only children's story ever published by Hardy, it was not published until 1892 in the Youth's Companion, and then serialised in an American periodical, The Household, from November 1892 to April 1893. It was used as a basis for two films, The Secret Cave released in 1953 and a 1985 film Exploits At West Poley.

== Plot ==
Written in the Victorian era, the story is set in the fictional village of West Poley where water from a small river is used to run a watermill, but the miller's apprentice (a child) is badly beaten. The apprentice and two other children enter nearby caves and discover a previously unknown passage leading to a place where the river can easily be diverted into a different channel. After diverting it, they find the river now flows through another village (East Poley) and the West Poley mill can no longer operate. The children then stage a magic trick for the children of East Poley, claiming to be able to redirect the river at will. However, they discover that not all is well in East Poley after the redirection (for example a landowner tries to turn a poorer lady's garden into a mill pond) and so they decide to divert the river down a third channel and permanently seal off the first two channels so that the river will flow through neither village. The third channel, however, turns out to be a cul-de-sac, and the cave begins filling with water. The children decide they have been meddling too much and begin removing their stones, but are unable to complete this work before the water traps them. The miller arrives (together with the shoemaker) via an alternative entrance that was not previously known to be connected to the same cave; the miller falls into the water and nearly drowns, and his apprentice saves him after making him promise not to beat him again. Next the miller wishes to have priority on the rescue rope, which the child grants in exchange for his complete release. All are saved, and then the pressure of the accumulating water becomes strong enough to forcibly reopen its original channel and everything goes back to normal. However the details of the cave are now public knowledge, and the adults of the two villages proceed to engage in their own squabbles over the river, redirecting it several times. To end this, one of the original children obtains a small amount of gunpowder and, using his intimate knowledge of the cave to position it effectively, seals both access routes beyond all hope of being reopened. All then settled down to a quiet life.
