= The Unconquerable =

Thomas Hardy short story

"The Unconquerable" is a short story traditionally credited to Thomas Hardy, though its true authorship has long been the subject of controversy. The story of two friends’ rivalry over a young lady was written around 1910/11 but was never published during Hardy’s lifetime.

== Plot ==
Philip Fadelle and Roger Wingate had been close friends since boyhood. This friendship continued well into adulthood, even when the scholarly Fadelle and the roguish politician Wingate realized they both had intentions toward the same young woman, Gertrude Norton. Temporarily waylaid on the day that he intended to propose marriage to Gertrude, Fadelle arrives at her house only to find that she had accepted the same proposal from Wingate just hours before.

Fadelle maintains his friendship with the married couple throughout the ensuing years, and is thus distraught when five years after the marriage Wingate is fatally struck down by a sudden illness. He learns from Gertrude that Wingate’s dying wish was to have Fadelle write a commemorative biography about Wingate’s political and business successes. Seeing an opportunity to ingratiate himself to Gertrude – for whom he still has deep yearnings – Wingate constructs a glorious re-telling of his friend’s career.

Some time having passed since Wingate’s passing and the commissioning of the biography, Fadelle visits Gertrude, both to present her with the draft of the manuscript and to finally express his romantic intentions toward her. He finds to his dismay that she is still deeply in love with her late husband, and that the glowing portrayal of him in the biography had made this love even more resilient and resistant to any future suitors.

During the visit Gertrude shows Fadelle a roomful of Wingate’s letters and documents which she has never gone through and which she suggests to Fadelle might be useful in finishing the biography. In going through the documents Fadelle is shocked to discover that every one of Wingate’s successes throughout his life – including his marriage – was achieved by gross treachery and deceit. Fadelle is subsequently faced with the moral dilemma of either exposing Wingate as the criminal he was – in doing so wresting Gertrude from the grips of her treasured memories of her late husband - or destroying the evidence of Wingate’s amoral life.

== Authorship controversy ==
In the only known typescript copy of the text of "The Unconquerable", authorship of the story is accredited to F. E. Dugdale. Florence Dugdale was a writer and teacher who became Hardy’s personal secretary in 1905 and his second wife in 1914. Hardy’s direct influence on her work and hers on his has been a continuing subject of debate. "The Unconquerable" and another story with similarly unclear origins, "Blue Jimmy: The Horse Stealer", are currently categorized as collaborations between the two. Extant original typescript copies of these two stories show extensive penciled corrections and annotations in Hardy’s hand, including stylistic changes in which the text is said to have been “Hardyized”.

In his book The Older Hardy, Robert Gittings maintains that Hardy wrote the entirety of the stories and passed them off as Florence’s work. In her introduction to Thomas Hardy: The Excluded and Collaborative Stories Pamela Dalziel states “…the only specific external evidence of Hardy's participation in [Dugdale’s stories] is the presence of his hand on the 'Blue Jimmy' proofs and the typescript of 'The Unconquerable'".

Pamela Dalziel has suggested that Hardy provided the plot, Dugdale wrote the first draft, and then he made subsequent revisions.

The acknowledgements page of the 1992 anthology Thomas Hardy: The Excluded and Collaborative Stories notes the copyright to "The Unconquerable" as being held by the Trustees of the Florence Dugdale Estate”.

== Publication ==
"The Unconquerable" was not published until over sixty years after Hardy’s death. In 1992 it was included in the Clarendon/Oxford University Press anthology Thomas Hardy: The Excluded and Collaborative Stories, edited and with an introduction by Pamela Dalziel.
