= A Laodicean =

1881 novel by Thomas Hardy

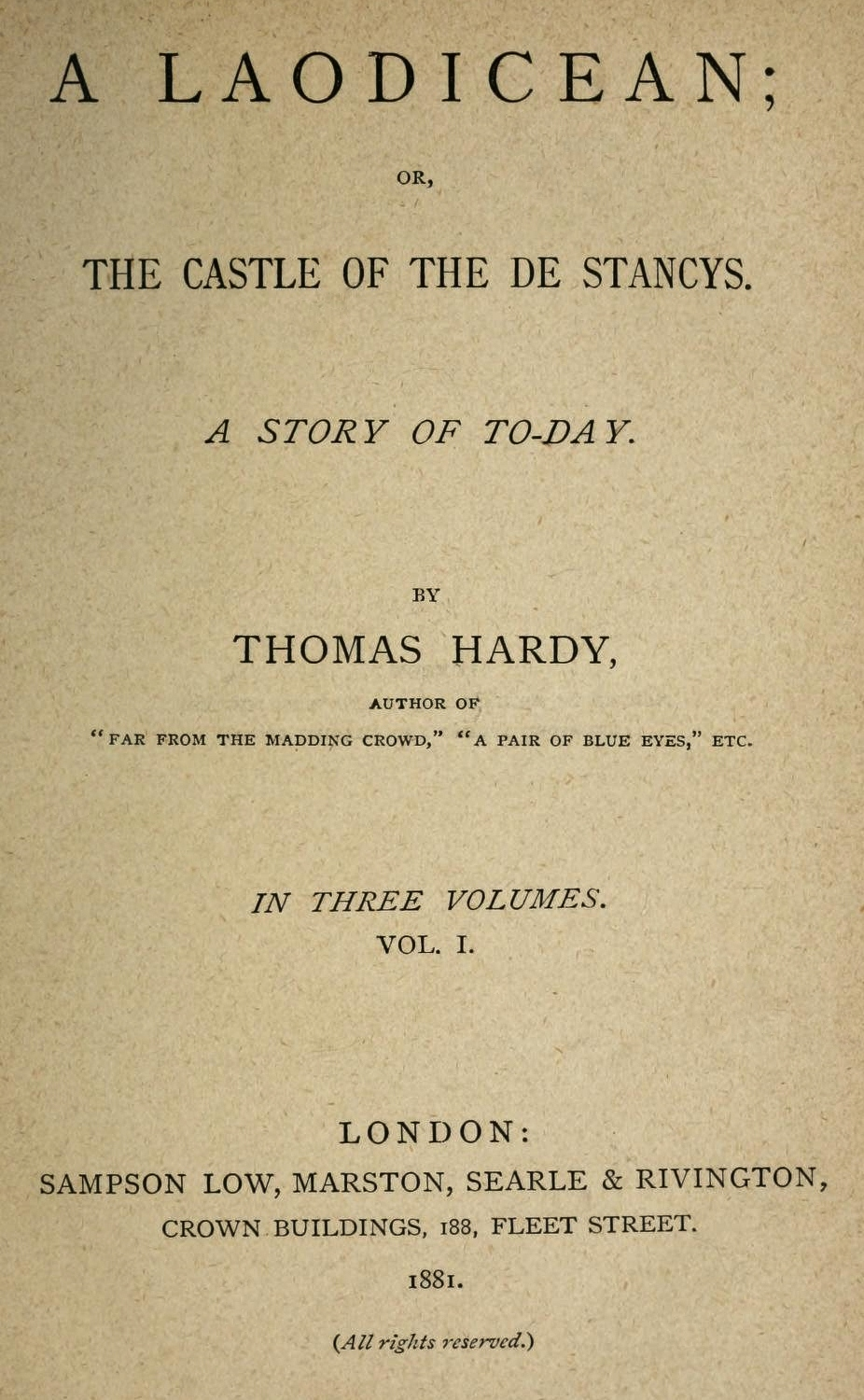
- First edition's title page
- Author: Thomas Hardy
- Language: English
- Genre: Novel
- Publisher: Sampson Low, Marston, Searle & Rivington
- Publication date: 1881
- Publication place: England

A Laodicean; or, The Castle of the De Stancys. A Story of To-Day is the eighth published novel by English author Thomas Hardy, first published in 1880–81 in Harper's New Monthly Magazine. The plot exhibits devices uncommon in Hardy's other fiction, such as falsified telegrams and faked photographs.

== Synopsis ==
Paula Power inherits a medieval castle from her industrialist father who had purchased it from the aristocratic De Stancy family.

She employs two architects, one local and one, George Somerset, newly qualified from London. Somerset represents modernity in the novel. In the village there is an amateur photographer, William Dare, the illegitimate son of Captain De Stancy, an impoverished scion of that family. Captain De Stancy represents to Paula the notion of medieval nobility.

She is attracted to each man for his respectively different virtues.

William Dare, bastard and unrecognised son of Captain de Stancy, and a thorough wastrel, decides to intervene to promote his father in her affections (solely so that he, Dare, can continue to gamble and live off Paula's income). He fakes a telegram and a photograph to make it appear that Somerset is leading a dissolute lifestyle as a drunken gambler. His subterfuge is discovered by Captain De Stancy's sister Charlotte who has befriended Paula.

She decides to tell Paula the truth and Paula pursues Somerset to the continent where he has gone mistakenly believing Paula and the Captain to have been married. She finds him and they are reunited and marry. In revenge, Dare burns down the castle using his family's portraits and furniture as kindling; Somerset proposes to build a modern house in its place.

The last line has Paula summing up her dichotomy of mind between modernity and romantic medievalism, and thus the two men, also emphasising the title "a Laodicean" (someone indifferent or half-hearted) — "I wish my castle wasn't burnt; and I wish you were a De Stancy!" The usage of "Laodicean" to mean someone lacking commitment comes from a reference in the New Testament:

To the angel of the church in Laodicaea write: — "These are the words of the Unchanging One, 'the witness faithful and true, the beginning of the Creation of God': —I know your life; I know that you are neither cold nor hot. If only you were either cold or hot! But now, because you are lukewarm, neither hot nor cold, I am about to spit you out of my mouth."

— Revelation 3:14–16 OEB

== Reception and criticism ==
In his 1910 Essays on Modern Novelists, American critic and scholar William Lyon Phelps, wrote:

No one of Mr Hardy's novels contain more of the facts of his own life than A Laodicean, which was composed on what the author then believed to be his death bed; it was mainly dictated, which I think partly accounts for its difference in style from the other tales... Not only does Mr Hardy's scientific profession speak through the mouths of his characters, but old and beautiful buildings adorn his pages as they do the landscape he loves.
