= The Poor Man and the Lady =

Unpublished 1867-68 novel by Thomas Hardy

The Poor Man and the Lady was the first novel written by Thomas Hardy. It was written in 1867 to 1868 and never published. After the manuscript had been rejected by at least five publishers, Hardy gave up his attempts to sell the novel in its original form; however, he incorporated some of its scenes and themes into later works, notably in the poem "The Poor Man and the Lady" and in the novella An Indiscretion in the Life of an Heiress (1878).

The manuscript no longer exists; Hardy destroyed the last surviving fragment during his last years, after abandoning the idea of reconstructing the rest of the novel from memory.
