= Poems of 1912–13 =

Elegiac sequence by Thomas Hardy

Poems of 1912–13 are an elegiac sequence written by Thomas Hardy in response to the death of his wife Emma in November 1912. An unsentimental meditation upon a complex marriage, the sequence's emotional honesty and direct style made its poems some of the most effective and best-loved lyrics in the English language.

In intensely personal poetic verse, Hardy addresses what the loss of a loved one means to the self. The obligation that forces one to abide faithfully to the memories of the dead, as well as reflection on and regret of the imperfections of their life together, pervade the poetry that Hardy produced as he reflected on the meaning of his own life in the new century. He wrote 15 poems named by the year of her death.

== Illustrative examples ==
Three poems from Poems of 1912–13 – "Without Ceremony", "Beeny Cliff", and "At Castle Boterel" – together represent experiences that Hardy and Emma had shared prior to their marriage. Consequently, these poems are Hardy's memory of that earlier time, placed in connection with his recent loss.

"Without Ceremony" is about Emma's spontaneous nature. While it may perhaps be related to the last time she entertained guests who stayed longer than they should have, more significantly it conveys Hardy's sense (like many people in mourning) that he never had a proper chance to say good-bye to Emma. The lack of ceremony of her departure from life it details resonated with the estrangement of their marriage, which saw his growing indifference matched by her unpredictable attempts at independence. The resulting bitterness infusing Hardy's feelings was one of the motivations behind his subsequent pilgrimage to the places where he and Emma had first met, to recapture something of those happier times in his poetry.

"Beeny Cliff" is one such poem. It begins with an idealised celebration of the young Emma's beauty, as first encountered at Beeny; before switching decades on to the present and her permanent absence. Hardy used the waves, "engrossed in saying their ceaseless babbling say" (l. 5) that crashed against the cliff, as a metaphor for time, which moves forward mechanically, routinely, and without any concern for people. In the poem, Hardy is again on the cliff where he and Emma had once stood, and the landscape is the same, but the waves—or time—has taken Emma to a place where she no longer "cares for Beeny, and will laugh there nevermore" (l. 15).

In "At Castle Boterel", Hardy is visiting another place from his past with Emma, and again the merciless movement of time, and the double vision of past and present, is a major theme. As long as Hardy is alive, the rocks on the hill will "record in colour and cast" (ln. 24) that Hardy and Emma had walked with their pony over the hill. This projection of Hardy's memory on the landscape is represented as "one phantom figure" (ln. 28) which is shrinking to nothing, because Hardy's "sand is sinking" (ln. 33). In other words, time is overtaking Hardy, and once he is gone, any record of the intimate moments between him and Emma will also be gone, although arguably at least for Hardy the quality of the experience, its intensity, outweighs the march of time.

== Themes ==
- Hardy used mythology, as well as the connection of landscape, to help articulate his memories of Emma, and communicate with the subliminal world in which Emma's voice resides. The stories of Tristan and Iseult (with their Cornish connection), Aeneas and Dido, and Orpheus and Eurydice, were all used to help articulate his feelings for, and mourning of, Emma. The theme of the "underworld" is especially prominent in his quest for his dead wife. While Hardy has been criticised for a too-narrow use of mythology throughout his writings,, the legendary stories about mythological figures that had loved and lost, helped provide what William Buckler calls "mythic subtext" to Hardy's poems.
- The next issue that criticism of Hardy's poems focuses on is movement and communication. It has been noted by Marie A. Quinn that Hardy's use of the word "haunting" is his way of communicating and moving between worlds. Emma's death placed her centrally in Hardy's set of ghosts; and by including this haunting element in his poetry, Hardy can communicate with his dead wife, or at least articulate their miscommunication.
- Finally, critics have dealt with the issue of reconciliation and renewal. Critics have noted that Hardy in writing these poems reconciled and renewed himself. By placing the voice of his poems on the same plane as his dead wife, Hardy makes himself accessible to her in death. He spiritually renewed himself by dealing with his grief through the writing of these poems.

== Textual history ==
Eighteen poems were included in the original Poems of 1912-13 (a section in Satires of Circumstance), but three more were added to the sequence in all subsequent editions. That total of twenty-one was still only a fraction of the fifty or so poems that he wrote to Emma in his first year of grief, not to mention the hundred or so more he wrote to her during the remainder of his life.

== See also ==
- Aisling
- Birthday Letters
- Coventry Patmore
- Dante
- Limerence
- Shakespeare's Sonnets

== Bibliography ==
- Buckler, William E. "The Dark Space Illuminated: A Reading of Hardy's Poems of 1912-1913", Victorian Poetry 17 (1979): 98–107.
- Millgate, Michael (ed.) The Life and Work of Thomas Hardy, Athens, GA: University of Georgia Press, 1985.
- Quinn, Maire A. "The Personal Past in the Poetry of Thomas Hardy and Edward Thomas". Critical Quarterly 16:7-28.
