= Thomas Hardy's Wessex =

Fictional setting for Hardy's novels

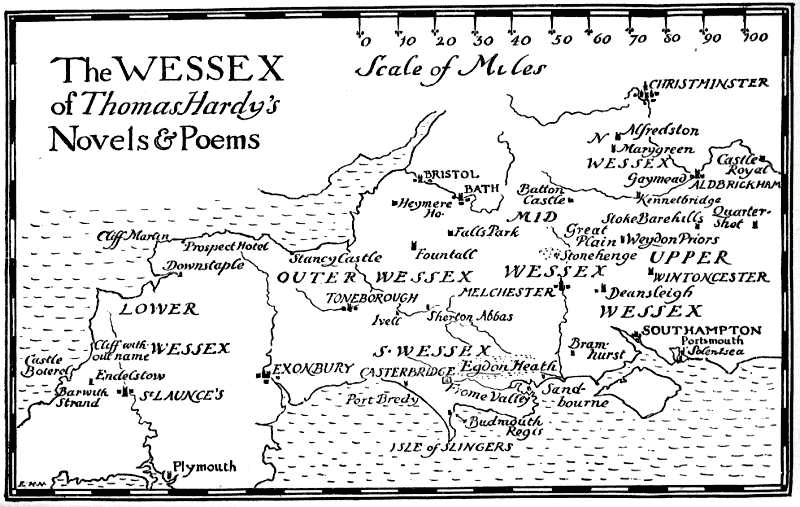
Locations in Wessex, from The Wessex of Thomas Hardy by Bertram Windle, 1902, based on correspondence with Hardy

Thomas Hardy's Wessex is the fictional literary landscape created by the English author Thomas Hardy as the setting for his major novels, located in the south and southwest of England. Hardy named the area "Wessex" after the medieval Anglo-Saxon kingdom that existed in this part of that country prior to the unification of England by Æthelstan. Although the places that appear in his novels actually exist, in many cases he gave the place a fictional name. For example, Hardy's home town of Dorchester is called Casterbridge in his books, notably in The Mayor of Casterbridge. In an 1895 preface to the 1874 novel Far from the Madding Crowd he described Wessex as "a merely realistic dream country".

== Changing definitions over the years ==
The actual definition of "Hardy's Wessex" varied widely throughout Hardy's career, and was not definitively settled until after he retired from writing novels. When he created the concept of a fictional Wessex, it consisted merely of the small area of Dorset in which Hardy grew up; by the time he wrote Jude the Obscure, the boundaries had extended to include all of Dorset, Wiltshire, Somerset, Devon, Hampshire, much of Berkshire, and some of Oxfordshire, with its most north-easterly point being Oxford (renamed "Christminster" in the novel). Cornwall was also referred to but named "Off Wessex". Similarly, the nature and significance of ideas of "Wessex" were developed over a long series of novels through a lengthy period of time. The idea of Wessex plays an important artistic role in Hardy's works (particularly his later novels), assisting the presentation of themes of progress, primitivism, sexuality, religion, nature and naturalism. However, this is complicated by the economic role Wessex played in Hardy's career. Considering himself primarily to be a poet, Hardy wrote novels mostly to earn money. Books that could be marketed under the Hardy brand of "Wessex novels" were particularly lucrative, which gave rise to a tendency to sentimentalised, picturesque, populist descriptions of Wessex.

== Impact in geography ==
Hardy's resurrection of the name "Wessex" is largely responsible for the popular modern use of the term to describe the south-west region of England (with the exception of Cornwall and arguably Devon). Today, a panoply of organisations take their name from Hardy to describe their relationship to the area. Hardy's conception of Wessex as a separate, cohesive geographical and political identity has proved powerful, although it was originally created purely as an artistic conceit, and has spawned a lucrative tourist trade, and even a devolutionist Wessex Regionalist Party.

== Thomas Hardy's Wessex names ==
=== Wessex regions and actual English counties ===
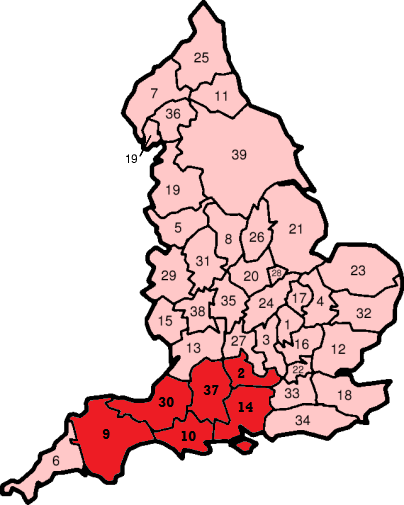
Map of the historic counties of England on which the approximate regions of Wessex can be found. Hardy did not always use the historic boundaries in his writings

Region of Wessex	Actual English County	Position on Map
Lower Wessex	Devon	9
Mid Wessex	Wiltshire	37
North Wessex	Berkshire	2
Outer Wessex	Somerset	30
South Wessex	Dorset	10
Upper Wessex	Hampshire	14

(Note: The Isle of Wight, although today a separate administrative county, was considered to be a part of the county of Hampshire – and thus Upper Wessex – during Thomas Hardy's lifetime. Likewise, Alfredston (Wantage) and the surrounding area in North Wessex was part of Berkshire prior to the 1974 boundary changes but now lies in administrative Oxfordshire.)

Outer Wessex is sometimes referred to as Nether Wessex.

=== Specific places in Thomas Hardy's Wessex ===
==== Key to references for the place name table ====
The abbreviations for Thomas Hardy's novels that are used in the table are as follows:

1. DR – Desperate Remedies (1871)
2. UtGT – Under the Greenwood Tree (1872)
3. PoBE – A Pair of Blue Eyes (1873)
4. FftMC – Far from the Madding Crowd (1874)
5. HoE – The Hand of Ethelberta (1876)
6. RotN – The Return of the Native (1878)
7. TM – The Trumpet-Major (1880)
8. L – A Laodicean (1881)
9. ToaT – Two on a Tower (1882)
10. MoC – The Mayor of Casterbridge (1886)
11. W – The Woodlanders (1887)
12. WT – Wessex Tales (1888)
13. TotD – Tess of the d'Urbervilles (1891)
14. JtO – Jude the Obscure (1895)
15. WB – The Well-Beloved (1897)
- WP – Wessex Poems and Other Verses (1898)
- LLI – Life's Little Ironies (1894)
- D – The Dynasts (1904-8)

==== Table of Wessex place-names, their actual places, and their appearance in Hardy's novels ====
Wessex Name	Region of Wessex	Actual Name	Appearance in Hardy's Novels
Abbot's-Cernel	South Wessex	Cerne Abbas	Where Mrs. Dollery was driving to in the beginning of the novel. (W)
Abbotsea	South Wessex	Abbotsbury	
Aldbrickham	North Wessex	Reading	Where Jude and Sue lived together after Sue left Phillotson. It is also where Arabella used to work as a barmaid before she met Jude. (JtO)
Alderworth	South Wessex	Affpuddle	Clym rents a cottage here after marrying Eustacia. (RotN)
Alfredston	North Wessex	Wantage	Jude Fawley becomes a mason's apprentice there. It is also where he works following his marriage to Arabella Donn. (JtO)
Anglebury	South Wessex	Wareham	Where Thomasin and Wildeve's marriage did not take place due to an invalid licence (RotN); Where Ethelberta lodged in the beginning of the novel. (HoE)
Bramshurst	Upper Wessex	Lyndhurst	Tess and Angel fled to an unoccupied manor house in Bramshurst near the end of the novel. (TotD)
Budmouth	South Wessex	Weymouth	Where Frank Troy goes to gamble on horse races. (FftMC); Eustacia Vye's hometown (RotN); The working place of Owen. (DR); On the way home from Budmouth, Dick and Fancy confessed to each other. (UtGT); One of the cities where Farfrae did his business. (MoC); The neighbouring village of Overcombe/(Sutton Poyntz), the principal location of TM, is sometimes called Budmouth-Regis in Hardy's novels, but that is more precisely Melcombe Regis, where George III popularised the watering place; Weymouth is the other side of the river.(TM)
Casterbridge	South Wessex	Dorchester	The principal location of The Mayor of Casterbridge. (MoC); Where Fanny Robin dies at the poorhouse, and whose Corn Exchange is frequently visited by Bathsheba and Boldwood. (FftMC); Where Rhoda and Farmer Lodge's son is hanged. The Withered Arm. (WT); When Tess's horse died while delivering goods from her home town to Casterbridge. (TotD)
Chalk Newton	South Wessex	Maiden Newton	Site of Flintcomb-Ash farm, where Tess worked after Angel left her. (TotD)
Chaseborough	South Wessex	Cranborne	Tess passed through Chaseborough on the way from home to Trantridge. (TotD)
Christminster	North Wessex	Oxford	Where Jude Fawley goes to become a scholar, and is advised to give up his career choice. Sue Bridehead works in a shop which produces religious artefacts there, meets her cousin, and is thrown from her lodgings. (JtO); Cytherea and Owen's hometown. Although Christminster is technically not within the borders of Hardy's Wessex, as it is located to the north of the River Thames, he describes it in Jude the Obscure as "within hail of the Wessex border, and almost with the tip of one small toe within it". (DR)
Cliff Martin	Outer Wessex	Combe Martin	Combe Martin is actually in Devon, indicating that Hardy's boundaries are not necessarily linked to current county boundaries
Cresscombe	North Wessex	Letcombe Bassett	Arabella's hometown. (JtO)
Deansleigh	South Wessex	Romsey	Sir Ashley Mottisfont and his Lady Philipa reside at Deansleigh Park (probably a reference to Broadlands).
Downstaple	Lower Wessex	Barnstaple	
Durnover	South Wessex	Fordington	
Endelstow	Off Wessex	St Juliot	The home of Elfride Swancourt and her Rector father (PoBE). In real life this was where Thomas met Emma whom he later married.
Emminster	South Wessex	Beaminster	The home of Angel Clare, and the site of Clare's father's vicarage. (TotD)
Evershead	South Wessex	Evershot	Where Tess met Alec for the first time after they parted, when Alec was preaching. (TotD)
Exonbury	Lower Wessex	Exeter	Where Grace went to after she found out Fitzpier's affair. (W)
Falls Park	Outer Wessex	Mells Park	
Flintcomb-Ash		Dole's Ash Farm at Plush	The "starve-acre" farm where Tess undertakes hard manual field work. (TotD)
Fountall	Outer Wessex	Wells	
Gaymead	North Wessex	Theale	(JtO and WT)
Great Hintock	South Wessex	Melbury Osmond	The church of St. Osmund may be viewed as "the setting for the last scene in 'The Woodlanders' where Marty South is a solitary loyal figure at Giles Winterbourne's grave"
Havenpool	South Wessex	Poole	Newson landed here on his return from Newfoundland. (MoC); The principal location for the short story 'To Please His Wife': the story begins in "St. James's Church, in Havenpool Town" which corresponds to St James' Church, Poole. (LLI)
Isle of Slingers	South Wessex	Isle of Portland	The principal location of the Well-Beloved. (WB)
Ivell	Outer Wessex	Yeovil	A location in the short stories 'For Conscience' Sake' and 'A Tragedy of Two Ambitions'. One character is curate of St John's, Ivell, corresponding to the Church of St John the Baptist, Yeovil. (LLI)
Kennetbridge	North Wessex	Newbury	"A thriving town not more than a dozen miles south of Marygreen" (JtO) between Melchester and Christminster. The main road (A338) from Oxford to Salisbury runs past Fawley and through Hungerford, which may be Kennetbridge instead of Newbury, which is to the south-east of Fawley.
King's Hintock	South Wessex	Melbury Osmond	The short story 'First Countess of Wessex’ is set in Kings-Hintock Court (based on Melbury House in Melbury Sampford). Hardy's mother was born in Melbury Osmond the family home is the model for the Knap in the Wessex Tale 'Interlopers at the Knap' it stands at the top of the village street. (WT)
Kingsbere	South Wessex	Bere Regis	Here is situated the Church of the d'Urbervilles. After Tess' Father's death, the Durbeyfield family take refuge outside the chapel. (TotD)
Knollsea	South Wessex	Swanage	Where Lord Mountclere lived. (HoE)
Little Hintock	South Wessex	Melbury Bubb/Stockwood/Hermitage	In his 1912 preface to 'The Woodlanders' Hardy confessed to not knowing which village Little Hintock corresponded to. (W)
Longpuddle	South Wessex	Piddletrenthide	A recurring location in the short stories called 'A Few Crusted Characters'. Sometimes split into Upper Longpuddle (Piddletrenthide) and Lower Longpuddle (Piddlehinton). (LLI)
Lulwind Cove	South Wessex	Lulworth Cove	Where Sergeant Troy is thought to have drowned. (FftMC); Where Napoleon Bonaparte briefly visited under cover of darkness in the short story 'A Tradition of Eighteen Hundred and Four'. (LLI)
Lumsdon	North Wessex	Cumnor	It is there that Jude Fawley meets up with his old teacher Mr. Phillotson again. It is where Sue Bridehead starts to work as a teacher and promises herself in marriage to Mr. Phillotson. (JtO)
Marlott	South Wessex	Marnhull	Tess Durbeyfield is born and brought up there. After becoming pregnant by Alec D'Urberville she returns to the village and gives birth to a baby boy, who dies in infancy. (TotD)
Marygreen	North Wessex	Fawley	Drusilla Fawley runs a bakery there. It is the place where Sue Bridehead spent her childhood. Jude Fawley is brought there following the death of his father, and it is where he matures into a man. (JtO)
Melchester	Mid Wessex	Salisbury	This is the place where Jude goes to prepare himself for the ministry, and where Sue Bridehead is studying to become a teacher. The latter runs away from her school there, and later marries Mr. Phillotson in the town. (JtO); Where Troy's military camp deployed. (FftMC); Where Julian moved to after Ethelberta refuse his love. (HE); Lord Helmsdale was the bishop of Melchester. (ToaT); Tess and Angel pass through this city on their way to Stonehenge. (TotD); The main location in the short story 'On the Western Circuit'. (LLI)
Mellstock	South Wessex	Stinsford and Higher & Lower Bockhampton	Thomas Hardy's birthplace. Hardy's heart is also buried here, next to his first wife, Emma. Jude Fawley's father died there. (JtO); Nearly all of Under the Greenwood Tree is set in Mellstock. (UtGT)
Middleton	South Wessex	Milton Abbas	Where Charmond lived. (W)
Middleton Abbey	South Wessex	Milton Abbey	Where Charmond lived. (W)
Narrowbourne	Outer Wessex	West Coker	Where the main character is a priest in A Tragedy of Two Ambitions a short story part of Life's Little Ironies. (LLI)
Nether-Moynton	South Wessex	Owermoigne	Owermoigne village is described as Nether Moynton in Hardy's novels and his short story The Distracted Preacher in Wessex Tales takes place in the village. (WT)
Nuttlebury	South Wessex	Hazelbury Bryan	Tess passes through here on her way back home. (TotD)
Overcombe	South Wessex	Sutton Poyntz	The principal location of The Trumpet-Major.(TM); One of the places from where the vans of carriers in and out of Casterbridge hailed. (MoC)
Port Bredy	South Wessex	Bridport	Where Lucetta and Farfrae secretly married. (MoC)
Po'sham	South Wessex	Portesham	The home of Captain Thomas Hardy, one of Lord Nelson's commanders at the Battle of Trafalgar, who lived at Portesham House. (TM)
Quartershot	Upper Wessex	Aldershot	An important military station near Stoke-Barehills. (JtO)
Sandbourne	Upper Wessex	Bournemouth	Where Tess Durbeyfield lives with Alec d'Urberville, and where she murders him upon the return of her husband, Angel Clare. (TotD). It is also where Sue Bridehead's freethinking friend was buried, and where she was the only mourner at his funeral. (JtO); The principal location of The Hand of Ethelberta. (HoE)
Shaston	South Wessex	Shaftesbury	Jack Durbeyfield visits the doctor in Shaston and learns that he has a bad heart. (TotD) Mr. Phillotson moves there to run a school. Jude Fawley travels there to see Sue Bridehead, who, married to Mr. Phillotson, is working in the town, and they flee the place together. (JtO)
Sherton Abbas	South Wessex	Sherborne	The major neighbouring town of the Hintocks, where The Woodlanders took place. (W)
Slingers	South Wessex	Isle of Portland	The principal location of The Well-Beloved. (WB)
Solentsea	Upper Wessex	Southsea	The setting of the short story "An Imaginative Woman." (WT)
Stancy Castle	Outer Wessex	Dunster Castle	The principal location of A Laodicean. (L)
Stapleford	South Wessex	Stalbridge	Stapleford Park was owned by Timothy Petrick in the short story Squire Petrick's Lady
St Launce's	Lower Wessex	Launceston	
Stoke Barehills	Upper Wessex	Basingstoke	Where Great Wessex Agricultural Show was held. (JtO)
Stourcastle	South Wessex	Sturminster Newton	Tess travelled through here. (TotD)
Street of Wells	South Wessex	Fortuneswell	The main street on Isle of Slingers, where The Well-Beloved mostly took place. (WB)
Toneborough	Outer Wessex	Taunton	
Trantridge	South Wessex	Pentridge	Site of the D'Urberville estate. (TotD)
Warborne	South Wessex	Wimborne	Nearest town and railway station to Welland. (ToaT)
Weatherbury	South Wessex	Puddletown	Farms of Bathsheba and Boldwood, main setting for Far From the Madding Crowd (FftMC)
Weatherbury Farm	South Wessex	Waterston Manor	Bathsheba's farm, in Far From the Madding Crowd (FftMC)
Wellbridge	South Wessex	Wool	Where Tess told Angel her story after they married. (TotD)
Weydon-Priors	Upper Wessex	Weyhill	Where Michael Henchard sells his wife while he is drunk. (MoC)
Wintoncester	South Wessex	Winchester	Tess Durbeyfield is imprisoned and executed in this former capital of Wessex. (TotD)

== In art and books ==
Artists such as Walter Tyndale, Edmund Hort New, Charles George Harper and others, have painted or drawn the landscapes, places and buildings described in Hardy's novels. Their work was used to illustrate books exploring the real-life countryside on which the fictional county of Wessex was based:

- B. C. A. Windle & E. H. New (ill.). The Wessex of Thomas Hardy (London, New York, J. Lane, 1902).
- Charles G. Harper. The Hardy country; literary landmarks of the Wessex novels (London, A. & C. Black, 1904).
- Clive Holland. Wessex (A & C Black, 1906).
- Sidney Heath.The Heart of Wessex (Blackie & Son, 1910?).
- Charles G. Harper. Wessex ("Beautiful Britain", London: A. & C. Black, 1911).
- R. Thurston Hopkins & E. Harries (ill.). Thomas Hardy's Dorset (New York: D. Appleton and co. 1922).
- Hermann Lea. Thomas Hardy's Wessex (London, Macmillan and co. 1911).
- Ralph Pite, Hardy's geography: Wessex and the regional novel. Palgrave, 2002.
- Andrew D. Radford, Mapping the Wessex novel: landscape, history and the parochial in British literature, 1870–1940. (London; New York: Continuum International Pub., 2010.
- Walter Tyndale. Hardy country water-colours (A & C Black, 19??).
- Barry J Cade. Thomas Hardy's Locations (Casterbridge Publishing Limited 2015) A full colour tourist guide to the places Hardy had in mind when he wrote The Mayor of Casterbridge and Far from the Madding Crowd.
