= The Bottle Imp (disambiguation) =

The Bottle Imp is a story published in 1891 by Robert Louis Stevenson.

The Bottle Imp may also refer to:

- Bottle Imp (card game), 1995 trick-taking card game
- The Bottle Imp (film), 1917 silent fantasy film
- "The Bottle Imp" (Grimm), 2012 television episode
