= Walter Tyndale =

English landscape painter

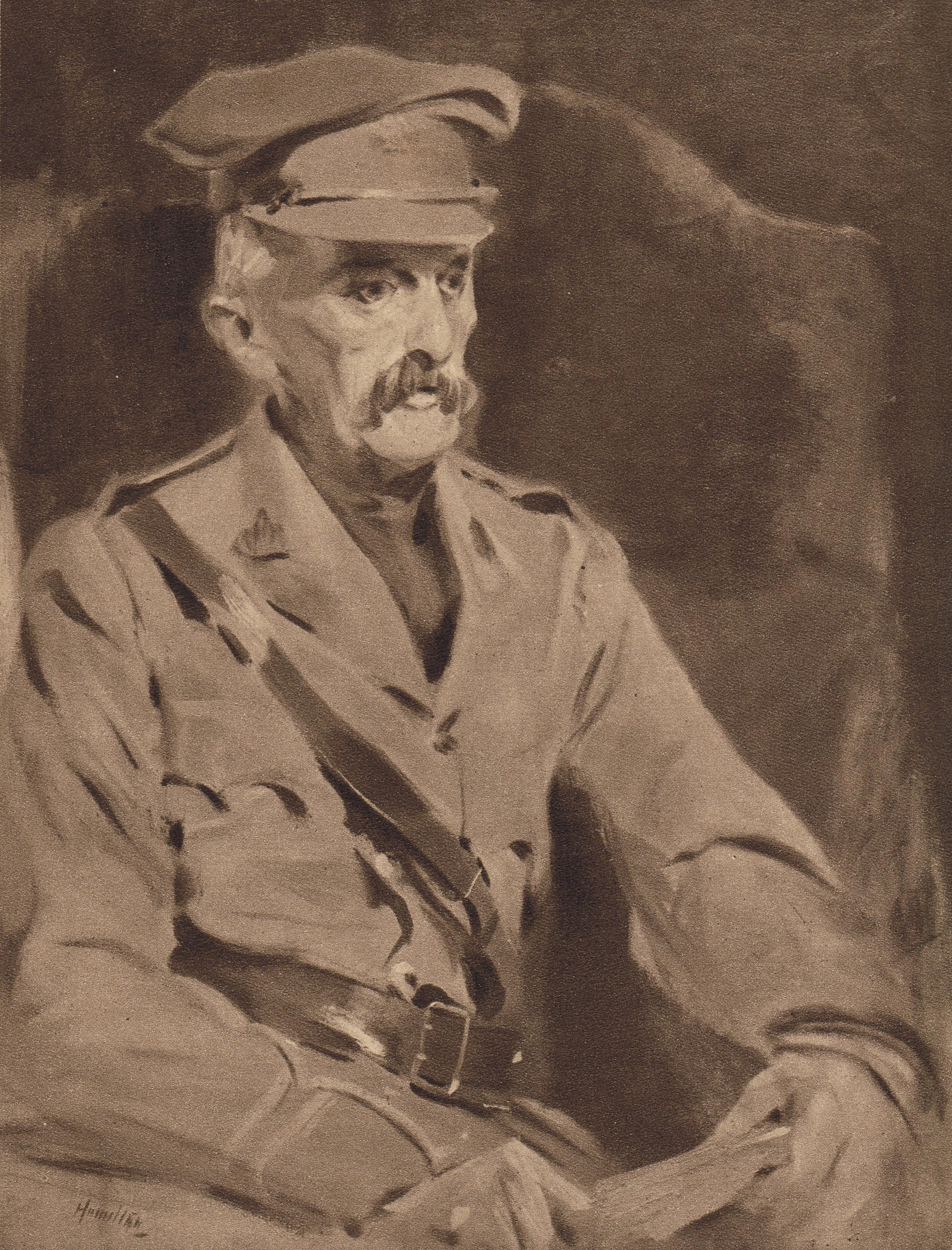
- Walter Tyndale, portrait by John McLure Hamilton
- Born: Walter Frederick Roope Tyndale; 1855; Bruges, Belgium
- Died: 1943 (aged 87–88); La Seyne-sur-Mer, France
- Education: Bruges Academy of Art; Royal Academy of Fine Arts (Antwerp); Léon Bonnat and Jan van Beers, Paris
- Known for: Painter and illustrator
- Movement: Orientalist

Walter Frederick Roope Tyndale RI (1855–1943) was a British watercolourist of landscapes, architecture and street scenes, book illustrator and travel writer.

Born to British parents and raised in Bruges, where he also trained, he found success after switching, relatively late in his career, to watercolour landscapes from portraits in oils. In the 1900s he began to produce illustrated books, in which his watercolours were rendered in colour as lithograph illustrations, accompanied by his own text in a breezy, unchallenging style. These were very successful and before World War I he had travelled as far as Egypt, the Middle East and Japan to produce new titles. His paintings tended to mix architecture and landscape, rather than show open country, with many cityscapes and street scenes. He also painted some of the scenes of elaborate gardens that were in fashion around 1900, in his book on Japan in particular.

In World War I, by now in his early 60s, he was the chief military censor in Boulogne.

== Life and works ==
=== Life as an artist ===
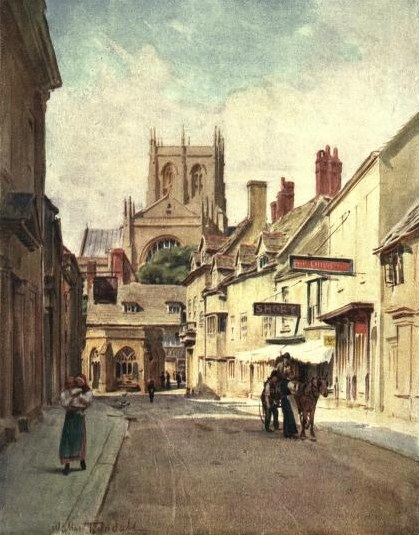
Long Street, Sherborne (The location for the "Sherton Abbas" of the "Wessex" novels of Thomas Hardy)

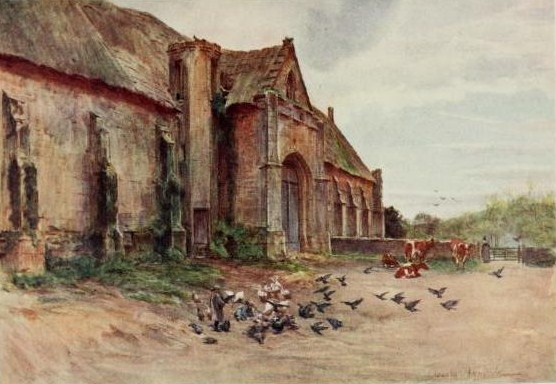
The Tithe Barn, Abbotsbury (scene of the sheep-shearing in Thomas Hardy's "Far from the madding crowd")

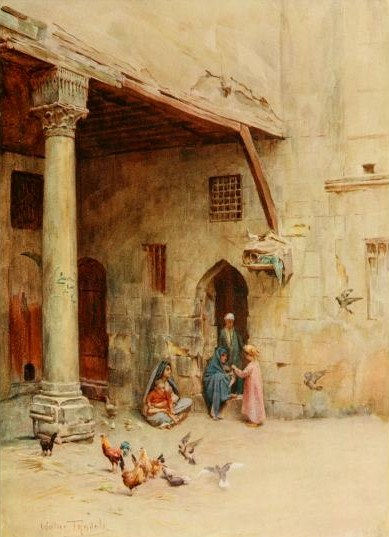
A "Takhtabosh" (or loggia) in Cairo

Tyndale was born and brought up in the medieval town of Bruges in Belgium, and trained initially at the "Bruges Academy of Art". When he was 16, his family returned to England, settling in Bath in Somerset for several years. At the age of 18, he returned to Belgium, studying art first at the Academy in Antwerp, then moving to Paris where he studied under Léon Bonnat and Jan van Beers.

In the 1870s, At the age of 21, circumstances obliged him to return to England in order to make a living from his art. He painted portraits and genre works in oils, and married a Miss Evelyn Dorothea Barnard. Until about 1890, he was known mainly as a portrait painter, and after one commission found himself in demand for portraits of the recently deceased from photographs, a rather depressing speciality. He had moved with his wife to Haslemere in Surrey, and started to teach private lessons in painting. One new pupil asked to be taught landscape watercolours, a technique his Continental training had not covered, but which he took to very easily. Thereafter he very rarely returned to oils.

He generally painted en plein air, but this meant that he only painted in England during the summer, when the weather was good, and travelled south during the rest of the year. One consequence of this, as he admitted himself, was that his subjects tended to be brightly lit, and his skies clear; his paintings mostly lack the interest in cloudy skies of his friend Claude Hayes.

He eventually commissioned the building of an Arts and Crafts movement-style house for himself called "Broad Dene" (1908), located on Hill Road in the town.

Tyndale travelled to the Netherlands (with friend and fellow artist Claude Hayes), then to Portugal, where he held a successful exhibition in Porto. Subsequently, he painted in England (in a sketching group organised by Helen Allingham near Maidstone in Kent), and abroad in Morocco, Tunisia, Egypt, Lebanon, Syria, Sicily, Italy and Rothenburg, Bavaria (a town he described as "a little paradise for sketchers").

=== Illustrated books ===
Tyndale was one of the first illustrators to benefit from new developments in colour printing in the early 20th century, which led to a surge in demand for illustrations for travel books. He wrote and illustrated several volumes as well as providing pictures for other authors. His first commission was from Methuen for "The New Forest" (1904), and work on subsequent books (see bibliography) led to him travelling extensively in England, Italy, the Middle East and Japan, painting landscapes, street scenes and architecture.

For the book "Wessex" (A & C Black, 1906), Tyndale painted landscapes and buildings in the West country of England, some of which had inspired Thomas Hardy's "Wessex" novels. Some of these locations were suggested by Hardy himself, who praised the "fidelity, both in form and colour" of Tyndale's work. "The Studio" magazine commented on the "excellent draughtsmanship and the care with which architectural details are rendered".

=== Societies, exhibitions and legacy ===
Tyndale was a member of the Royal Institute of Painters in Watercolours (RI), a founding member of the "Haslemere Art Society" and president of the latter between 1930 and 1932. Tyndale exhibited his works at various venues including the Royal Academy, the RI gallery in Piccadilly and Dowdeswell Galleries in London. His main artistic influences were his friend, the watercolourist Claude Hayes and, to a lesser extent, Helen Allingham

Tyndale left three sizeable diaries, in which he recorded his travels, including correspondence with friends and family, postcards, photographs and some self-portraits.

== Bibliography ==
Written and illustrated by Tyndale:

- Below the cataracts (J. B. Lippincott company, 1907).
- Japan & the Japanese (MacMillan, 1910).
- L'Égypte d'hier et d'aujourd'hui (Paris Hachette, 1910).
- An artist in Egypt (Hodder & Stoughton, 1912).
- An artist in Italy (Hodder & Stoughton, 1912).
- An artist in the Riviera (Hearst's International Library, 1915).
- Hardy country water-colours (A & C Black, 1920) — abridged version of 1906 book. (Wessex (A & C Black, 1906) — painted by Walter Tyndale, described by Clive Holland. The illustrations derive from a June–July 1905 exhibition by Tyndale.)

Illustrated by Tyndale:

- Hutchinson, H. G. The New Forest (Methuen, 1904)
- Holland, Clive. Wessex (London: A. & C. Black, 1906)
- Charles G. Harper. Wessex (London: A. & C. Black, 1911)
- Taylor, Harriet Osgood. Japanese gardens (London: Methuen & Co., 1912)
- Horatio Brown, Dalmatia: painted by Walter Tyndale, described by Horatio F. Brown (London: A. & C. Black, 1925)

About Tyndale:

- Holland, Clive. Walter Tyndale: The man and his art (Studio International, volume 38, 1906, p288 ff).
- Ackerman, Gerald M. Les orientalistes de l'Ecole britannique, volume 9 (Art Creation Realisation, 1991) pp. 282–91.

== See also ==
- List of Orientalist artists
