= Island Nights' Entertainments =

1893 short story collection by Robert Louis Stevenson

- Author: Robert Louis Stevenson
- Language: English
- Publication date: 1893

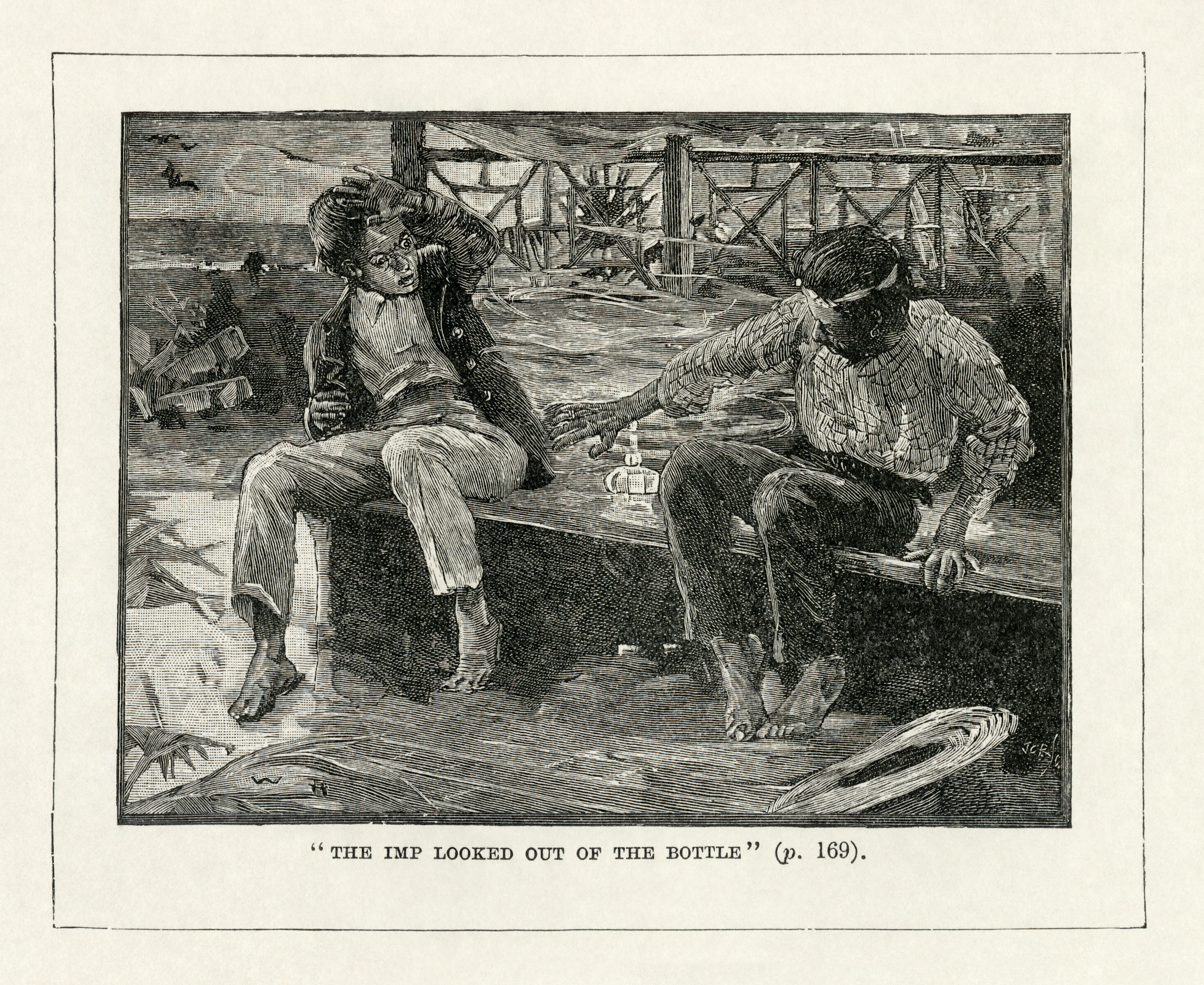
Illustration to Robert Louis Stevenson's "The Bottle Imp" by William Hatherell (1855–1928)

Island Nights' Entertainments (also known as South Sea Tales) is a collection of short stories by Robert Louis Stevenson, first published in 1893. It would prove to contain some of his final completed work before his death in 1894.

It contains three stories:

- "The Beach of Falesá"
- "The Bottle Imp"
- "The Isle of Voices"

== Dedication ==
The dedication was written in January 1892 in a letter to Charles Baxter, Robert Louis Stevenson's friend and adviser, and the book finally published in 1893. The dedication reads:

To three old shipmates among the islands,

Harry Henderson,
Ben Hird,
Jack Buckland,

their friend

R.L.S.

All three were Robert Louis Stevenson's fellow cabin passengers on the 1890 Janet Nicholl voyage. Harry Henderson was a partner in the firm Henderson and Macfarlane (died 1926, Melbourne); Ben Hird, the supercargo and trader; Jack Buckland a copra trader and original of the Tommy Hadden character in The Wrecker. Jack Buckland’s dedication copy of Island Nights’ Entertainments was inscribed by Stevenson to "Jack Buckland, from Robert Louis Stevenson".
