= George Macy =

American publisher

George Macy (1900–1956) was an American publisher.

== Career ==
George Macy was born in New York City in 1900. He graduated in 1917 with general honors from DeWitt Clinton High School in the Bronx.

In 1926, he founded Macy-Masius, which was sold to the Vanguard Press in 1928.

In 1929, he founded the Limited Editions Club, publishing finely illustrated books that were limited to 1500 copies and signed by the author or artist who were famous in the graphic arts. On November 14, 2024 a complete run of Limited Editions Club publications, sold for $34,925 by Freeman's|Hindman Auction House.

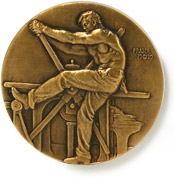
American Institute of Graphic Arts medal awarded to George Macy in 1953.

By setting up a subscription service, Macy was able to work with a larger budget for subscribers. His goal was to create a more affordable way for classic books to get to the masses. Artists contracted to illustrate books were given a lot of freedom and budget, but also sometimes lost his gambles. The 1935 publication of James Joyce's Ulysses was illustrated with line drawings by Henri Matisse, which are almost unrelated to the text.

In 1935, he expanded his publishing with The Heritage Press. Macy worked that year with Nonesuch Press to rescue it from its financial difficulties. The first project was with the complete works of Charles Dickens in 1938.

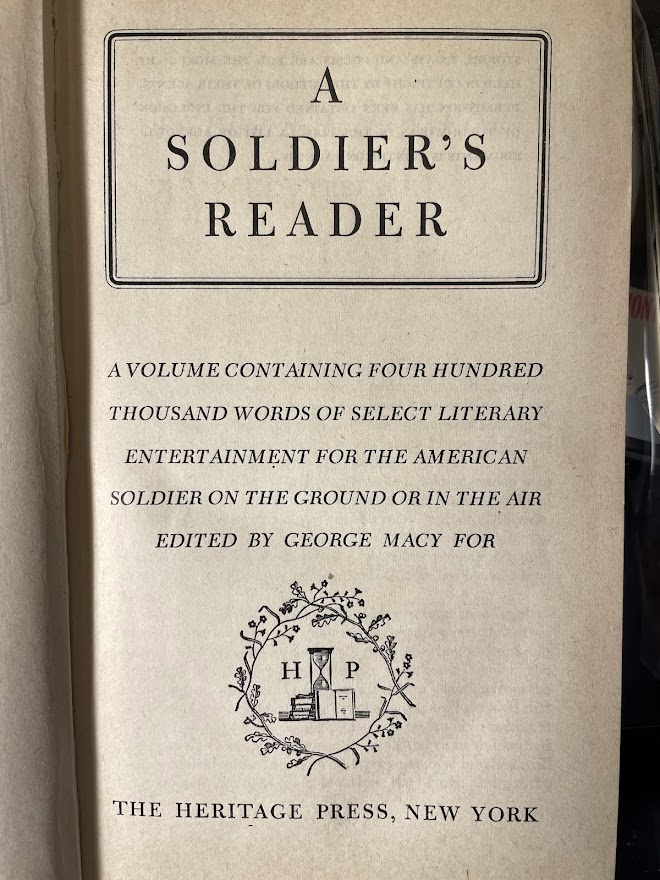
A Soldier's Reader 1943. 751 pages. Book for soldiers to take with them in World War II

In 1943 he edited and published A Soldier's Reader: A Volume Containing Four Hundred Thousand Words of Select Literary Entertainment for the American Soldier on the Ground or in the Air.

Macy became a Chevalier of the Legion of Honor after a 1948 display of his work at the Bibliothèque nationale de France. In 1952 the British Library held an exhibit of his work.

In 1953 he was awarded the AIGA medal for his work as a publisher by the American Institute of Graphic Arts.

At services held in Macy's memory after his death 1956 Nunnally Johnson spoke of his great love of fine and beautiful books which "more than any man in the long history of bookmaking, he caused to be fashioned exquisitely and to be brought into homes that never before could afford the unimaginable joy of possessing them."

Macy's wife, Helen Macy, continued the work of The Limited Editions Club and Heritage Press until 1968 when their son became head of the company. The firms were sold to various publishing companies in 1970. These include the Boise-Cascade Company.

== Publications of The Heritage Press ==
The original six publications that the Heritage Press published were released in November and December 1935.

The original six artist-signed copies were:

1. David Copperfield by Charles Dickens/John Austen
2. Romeo and Juliet by William Shakespeare/Sylvain Sauvage
3. The Scarlet Letter by Nathaniel Hawthorne/W.A. Dwiggins
4. The Song of Songs which is Solomon/Valenti Angelo
5. The Story of Manon Lescaut by Abbe Prevost/Pierre Brissaud
6. A Shropshire Lad by A.E. Housman/Edward A. Wilson

== Additional sources ==
- Grossman, Carol P., Matthew Carter, Jerry Kelly, and PBtisk (Firm). 2017. The History of the Limited Editions Club. New Castle, DE: Oak Knoll Press.
- Limited Editions Club, and Denis Gouey. 1985. Bibliography of the Fine Books Published by the Limited Editions Club, 1929-1985. New York City: Limited Editions Club.
- Rogers, Bruce, and Bruce Rogers. A Record of the Proceedings at the Limited Editions Club's Dinner to Celebrate the Twenty-First Birthday of the Club & the Fiftieth Birthday of Its Founder : Together with a Reproduction of the Program and Menu, the Ritz-Carlton, New York, 11 May 1950. New York, NY: The Club], 1950.
