= The Heritage Press =

American publishing trade name

- Status: Defunct
- Predecessor: The Limited Editions Club
- Founded: 1937
- Founder: George Macy
- Defunct: 1982
- Successor: Easton Press
- Country of origin: United States
- Publication types: Limited edition books

The Heritage Press is a trade name which has been used by multiple printers and publishers. Most notably, "The Heritage Press" was an imprint of George Macy Companies, Ltd., from 1937 to 1982. The Heritage Press reprinted classic volumes previously published by the more exclusive Limited Editions Club.

== History ==
=== Original "Heritage Press" ===
In 1929, George Macy founded the Limited Editions Club and began publishing illustrated books in limited numbers (usually 1500 copies) for subscription members. In 1935 Macy founded the Heritage Club, which together with the Heritage Press, created and distributed more affordable and unlimited reprints of the great books previously published by The Limited Editions Club.

Macy was involved personally in the work of the Press, designing many of its publications, including The Grapes of Wrath, The Decameron, Hans Christian Andersen's Fairy Tales, and A Shropshire Lad.

He also authored The Collected Verses of George Jester (distributed in a limited number as a Macy family holiday greeting) and edited Heritage's A Sailor's Reader and A Soldier's Reader, which were wartime volumes, published in August 1943, of "four hundred thousand words of literary entertainment" for members of the American armed services.

Macy also acquired and operated another press publishing limited editions. In 1936, he became managing director of the Nonesuch Press of London, founded by Francis Meynell.

The Macy family sold their companies in 1970; Heritage Press was later sold to Easton Press.

The Harry Ransom Center contains a complete run of the Limited Editions Club and Heritage Press series. It also holds 6,731 original art works by over 100 artists, used in Limited Editions Club and Heritage Press publications, in the Ransom Center Art Collection.

=== California "Heritage Press" ===
In 1973 (following the 1970 acquisition of the original "Heritage Press", by Easton Press), another "Heritage Press" emerged in Signal Hill, California -- a comparatively minor publisher, compared to the original, and operating primarily as an on-demand "full service commercial printer," providing "commercial and security printing," and specializing in "stock certificates, prescription pads, and hit promotional products," though also printing "booklets,... postcards," and various business documents.

During the late-1990's the business merged with two other local printing companies, Masters Printing and Fast Print. The business reports that it has serviced printing customers in several cities in and around Southern California, and customers in ten communities in other states.

=== Michigan "Heritage Press" ===
The Tuscola County Advertiser newspaper (Caro, Michigan) has operated a small commercial print shop since its founding 1868. In 1984, it separated its print shop as a separate division, naming it "The Heritage Press." It subsequently added branches in Seneca, South Carolina and Riverton, Wyoming.

=== British (Islamic) "Heritage Press" ===
In June 2013, in the United Kingdom, another "Heritage Press" was founded as a publishing house. Its stated objective is to support "revival of the traditional Islamic sciences" and to distribute English-language "authentic, classical and contemporary texts [translated] into... English..." by "scholars... past and present" who have studied "mainstream Sunni orthodoxy."

== Publications ==
Publications of the Heritage Press covered a broad range of topics, primarily within the Western canon. Examples included editions of Bulfinch's Age of Fable, Jack London’s The Call of the Wild, Spenser's The Faerie Queene, Robert Louis Stevenson's full The Beach of Falesá, Jules Verne's Twenty Thousand Leagues Under the Seas and Les Miserables. A particularly large and ornate edition includes the complete scripts to all of Gilbert and Sullivan's operas, with an accompanying envelope containing facsimile memorabilia.

Aviation historian John W. Underwood has been among those whose books have been published by "Heritage Press" -- both before the sale of the original "Heritage Press" and after the appearance of the Signal Hill-based "Heritage Press," with those books noted as being from another Southern California city: "Glendale, California."

- Volume Number 17 Copyright 1940 - Diedrich Knickerbocker's History of New York by Washington Irving. Illustration by Don Freeman

== See also ==
- Modern Library
- Everyman's Library
- Folio Society
- Easton Press
- Franklin Library
