= Walter Stradling =

American cinematographer

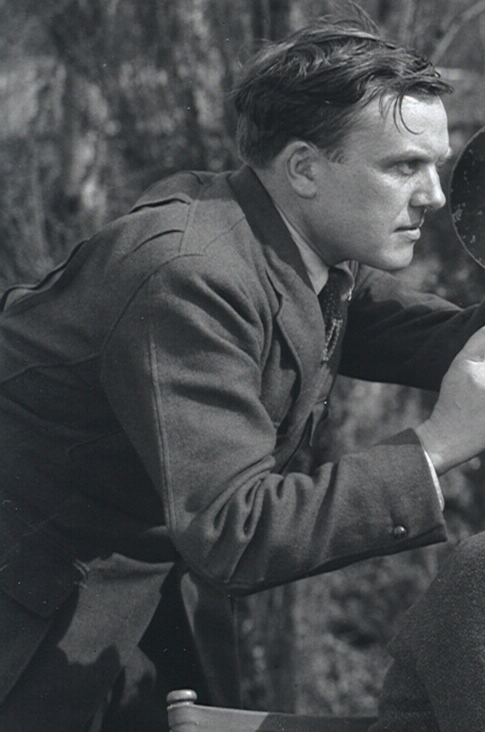
- Stradling in 1917.
- Born: Walter Ernest Stradling; 1875; Plymouth, Devon, England
- Died: July 4, 1918 (aged 42–43); New York City, New York
- Occupation: Cinematographer
- Years active: 1914–1918

Walter Stradling (1875 – July 4, 1918) was an English-born American cinematographer of the silent era. He is best remembered for working on several well-known feature films of Mary Pickford and for the Famous Players–Lasky production company in general. He also worked on the films of Cecil B. DeMille, Sessue Hayakawa and Blanche Sweet. Stradling died relatively young at 43 in the 1918 flu pandemic. He was the uncle of the cinematographer Harry Stradling.

== Partial filmography ==
- Young Romance (1915)
- A Gentleman of Leisure (1915)
- The Secret Sin (1915)
- The Ragamuffin (1916)
- Alien Souls (1916)
- The Bottle Imp (1917)
- The Silent Partner (1917)
- Rebecca of Sunnybrook Farm (1917)
- Amarilly of Clothes-Line Alley (1918)
- M'Liss (1918)
- Hit-The-Trail Holliday (1918)
- Heart of the Wilds (1918)
- Out of a Clear Sky (1918)
