= The Beach of Falesá =

1892 novella by Robert Louis Stevenson

"The Beach of Falesá" is a novella by Scottish author Robert Louis Stevenson. It was first published in the Illustrated London News in 1892, and later published in book form in the short-story collection Island Nights' Entertainments (1893). It was written after Stevenson moved to the South Seas island of Samoa just a few years before he died there.

== Synopsis ==
John Wiltshire, a Scottish copra trader, arrives on the fictional South Sea island of Falesá. Upon arriving on the island, he meets a rival trader named Case, who (in an apparently friendly gesture) arranges for him to be "married" to a local girl named Uma in a ceremony designed to impress the natives but to be completely non-binding in the view of Europeans.

Wiltshire soon discovers that Uma has a taboo attached to her which causes all the other natives to refuse to do business with him, to Case's profit. He also hears rumours of Case having been involved in the suspicious deaths of his previous competitors. Although realising that he has been tricked, Wiltshire has genuinely fallen in love with Uma, and has their marriage legalised by a passing missionary.

Wiltshire gradually learns that Case's influence over the villagers stems from their belief that he has demonic powers, as a result of his simple conjuring tricks as well as strange noises and visions they have experienced at a "temple" he has built in the forest. Upon investigating, Wiltshire finds that these experiences are also tricks produced by imported technologies such as luminous paint and Aeolian harps.

Wiltshire sets out that night to destroy the temple with gunpowder. Case confronts him and the two men fight, resulting in Case's death.

The story concludes with Wiltshire several years later living on another island, still happily married to Uma, worrying about what will happen to his mixed-race children.

== Analysis ==
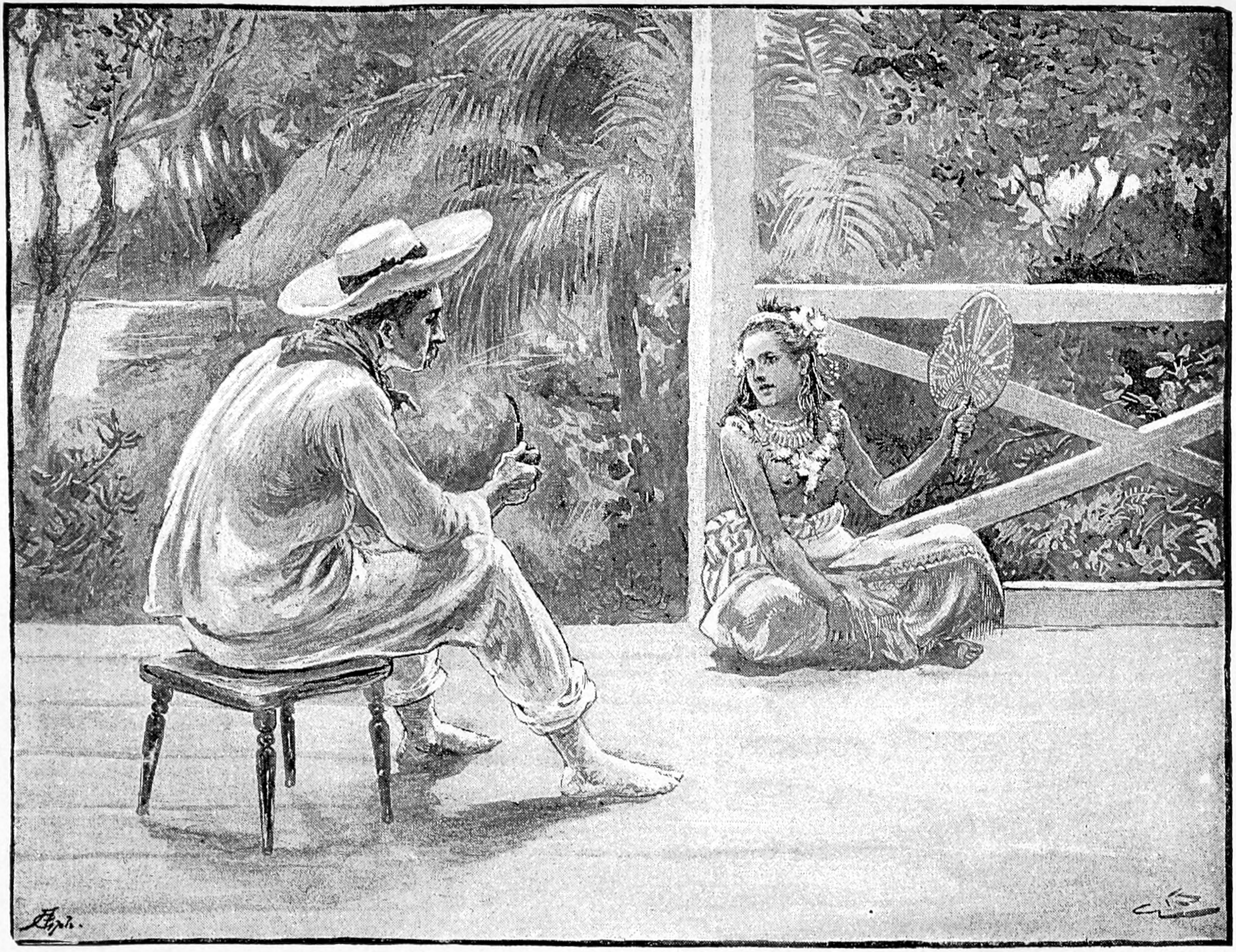
Wiltshire asks Uma, "what does fussy-ocky mean". Illustration by Gordon Browne.

Stevenson saw "The Beach of Falesá" as the ground-breaking work in his turn away from romance to realism. Stevenson wrote to his friend Sidney Colvin:

It is the first realistic South Seas story; I mean with real South Sea character and details of life. Everybody else that has tried, that I have seen, got carried away by the romance, and ended in a kind of sugar candy sham epic, and the whole effect was lost - there was not etching, no human grin, consequently no conviction. Now I have got the smell and look of the thing a good deal. You will know more about the South Seas after you have read my little tale than if you had read a library.

In an unusual change for Stevenson, but in line with realism, the plot of the story is less important, rather the realistic portrayal of the manners of various social classes in island society is foregrounded; it is essentially a novel of manners. As Stevenson says to Colvin in a letter, "The Beach of Falesá" is "well fed with facts" and "true to the manners of the society it depicts". Other than the island itself, which is fictional, it contains the names of real people, real ships and real buildings with which Stevenson was familiar from his personal travels in the South Seas.

Of further interest regarding the analysis of this text is its publication history. Censored by its publisher, "The Beach of Falesá" directly addresses British colonialism while confronting the taboos regarding miscegenation. A comparison of earlier printed editions to Stevenson's original draft has been a source of fairly recent scholarly inquiry. In a somewhat similar vein, another provocative approach to Stevenson's South Seas writings has been taken through the lens of ethnography.

In 1956, The Heritage Press of New York published a full version stating that "the text (of the 1892 serialization) was bowdlerized, and the present printing represents the story exactly as R.L.S. wrote it".

== Reception ==
"The Beach of Falesá", along with his two other South Seas tales in Island Nights' Entertainments, were generally poorly received by his peers in London. Stevenson was known and loved for his historical romances such as Treasure Island, Kidnapped and The Master of Ballantrae, and so his shift to realism was not widely applauded. Oscar Wilde complained, "I see that romantic surroundings [Samoa] are the worst surroundings possible for a romantic writer. In Gower Street Stevenson could have written a new Trois Mousquetaires. In Samoa he wrote letters to The Times about Germans." Edmund Gosse wrote, "The fact seems to be that it is very nice to live in Samoa, but not healthy to write there."

== Adaptations ==
Screenplays based on the novella were written by Dylan Thomas and Alan Sharp but never produced. Adding a narrator's voice, BBC Radio 3 broadcast Thomas's screenplay in May 2014.

Although its title was unnamed, the book was referenced significantly in the plotting of Georges Simenon's 1931 novel, "The Late Monsieur Gallet."

An operatic setting of the novella by Alun Hoddinott, to a libretto by Glyn Jones, was premiered by the Welsh National Opera in 1974. The three-act work, which was later televised, included in its cast Geraint Evans as Case, Sandra Browne as Uma, and Forbes Robinson as Black Jack.
