= The Fiddler of the Reels =

- Short story by Thomas Hardy
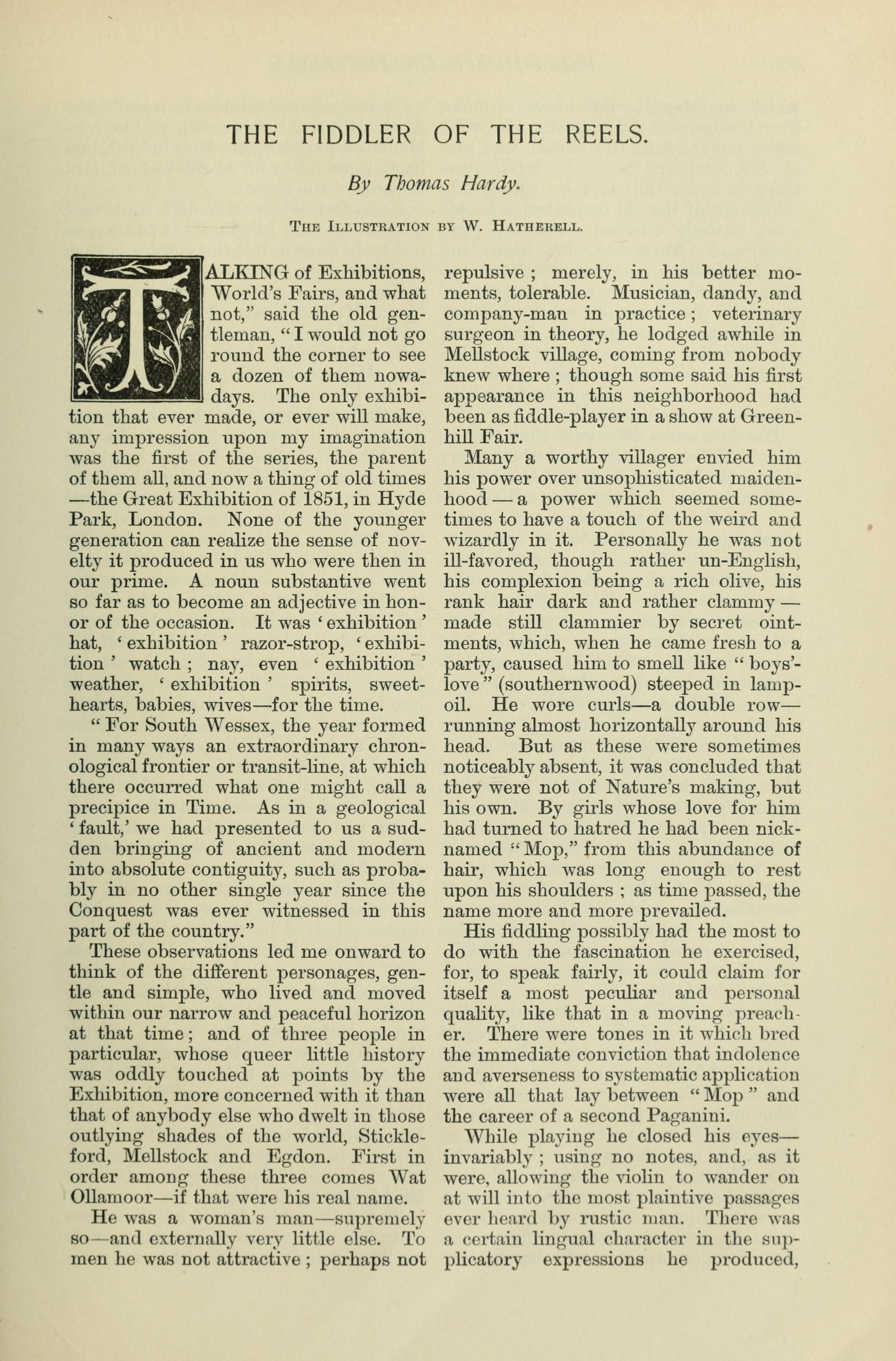
- Country: United Kingdom
- Language: English
- Genre: Short story

Publication
- Published in: Scribner's Magazine
- Publication type: Periodical
- Publisher: Charles Scribner's Sons
- Media type: Print
- Publication date: April 1893

"The Fiddler of the Reels" is a short story by British writer Thomas Hardy. It was first published in Scribner's Magazine, volume 13 issue 4, April 1893. It was included in Life's Little Ironies, a collection of Thomas Hardy's short stories first published in 1894.

In the story, set in South Wessex and London, the interaction of the lives of three people are related, at the time of the Great Exhibition in London, and of the coming of the railway to Wessex.

== Summary ==
An old man, reminiscing with the narrator about times past, comments on the Great Exhibition of 1851. He says, "For South Wessex, the year formed in many ways an extraordinary chronological frontier.... a sudden bringing of ancient and modern into absolute contact...." The conversation moves to people they knew at that time, particularly of three local people; their story is described.

Wat Ollamoor, a veterinary surgeon lodging in the village of Mellstock, is known as a fiddle-player; he is called "Mop" because of his long hair. His appearance and fiddle-playing are attractive to young ladies, in particular to Car'line Aspent of the nearby village of Stickleford. Ned Hipcroft is courting Car'line. When his proposal of marriage is rejected, Ned, a mechanic, goes to London (in six days' walking; the railway line was being built but was not open) and works there, living in Lambeth.

After four years in London he works on the glass-house of the Great Exhibition. He receives a letter from Car'line: she says she had been foolish to refuse him, and would gladly marry him. Ned, after a few days' consideration, replies: he is slightly reproachful and does not volunteer to return to Stickleford; agreeing to marry her, he suggests that she comes to London on the train, the railway line being now open.

She arrives, with a girl aged about three; they are wet after the journey in the rain in an open carriage. Ned, initially displeased by the unexpected presence of Car'line's daughter, acquiesces to the situation. They get married, visiting the Exhibition after they come back from church; their married life is comfortable.

After about three years Ned becomes short of work, and they decide to return home. At Casterbridge, where they leave the train, Ned makes inquiries about work in the town while Car'line and her daughter Carry walk to Stickleford. They stop for a rest at an inn; there is entertainment and, being recognized, Car'line is welcomed. There is dancing, to the music of Ollamoor's fiddle-playing. "The notes of that old violin... thrilled the London wife, these having still all the witchery that she had so well known of yore, and under which she had used to lose her power of independent will."

She takes part in a five-handed reel; she is eventually the only one left dancing, and finally faints. While she is being revived, Ollamoor disappears with the little girl. Ned, having arrived, is angered by Carry's disappearance, being more concerned about her than he is about his wife. Ollamoor and Carry are never seen again, despite Ned's return to London to look for them. It is supposed that Ollamoor and his daughter emigrated to America, "Mop, no doubt, finding the girl a highly desirable companion when he had trained her to keep him by her earnings as a dancer."

== Commentary ==
The writer and literary critic John Wain comments that Hardy had no particular regard for the short story as a literary form; that some of his stories have enough plot to have been a full-length novel. In "The Fiddler of the Reels", he suggests, Ned's return to London to look for Carry, or Ollamoor and his daughter's later adventures, could have been expanded if the writer had wished. Wain adds, "In such cases the decision to tell the story shortly is evidently an arbitrary choice on the author's part, rather than an artistic necessity inherent in the material chosen."
