= The Bottle Imp =

1891 short story by Robert Louis Stevenson

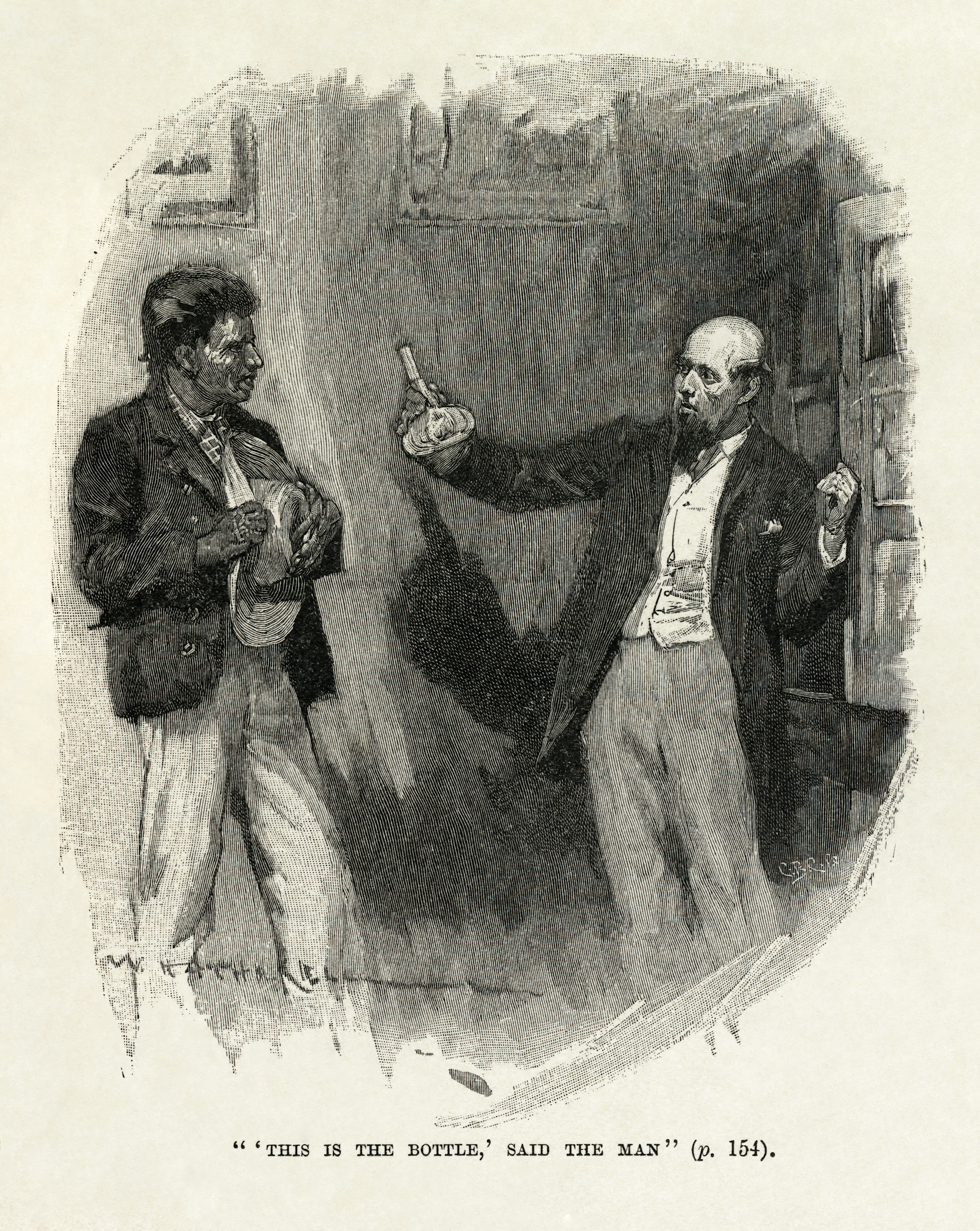
William Hatherell's 1905 illustration of the story; the bottle is presented to Keawe by its previous owner

"The Bottle Imp" is an 1891 short story by the Scottish author Robert Louis Stevenson usually found in the short story collection Island Nights' Entertainments. It was first published in the New York Herald (February–March 1891) and Black and White magazine (London, March–April 1891). In it, the protagonist buys a bottle with an imp inside that grants wishes. However, the bottle is cursed; if the holder dies bearing it, the holder's soul is forfeit to hell.

== Plot ==
Keawe, a poor Native Hawaiian, buys a strange unbreakable bottle from a sad, elderly gentleman in San Francisco who credits the bottle with his fortune. He promises that an imp residing in the bottle will also grant Keawe his every desire. However, the bottle must be sold, for cash, at a loss, i.e. for less than its owner originally paid, and cannot be thrown or given away, or else it will magically return to him. All of these rules must be explained by each seller to each purchaser. If an owner of the bottle dies without having sold it in the prescribed manner, that person's soul will burn for eternity in Hell.

The bottle was said to have been brought to Earth by the Devil and first purchased by Prester John for millions; it was owned by Napoleon and Captain James Cook and accounted for their great successes. By the beginning of the story the price has diminished to fifty dollars.

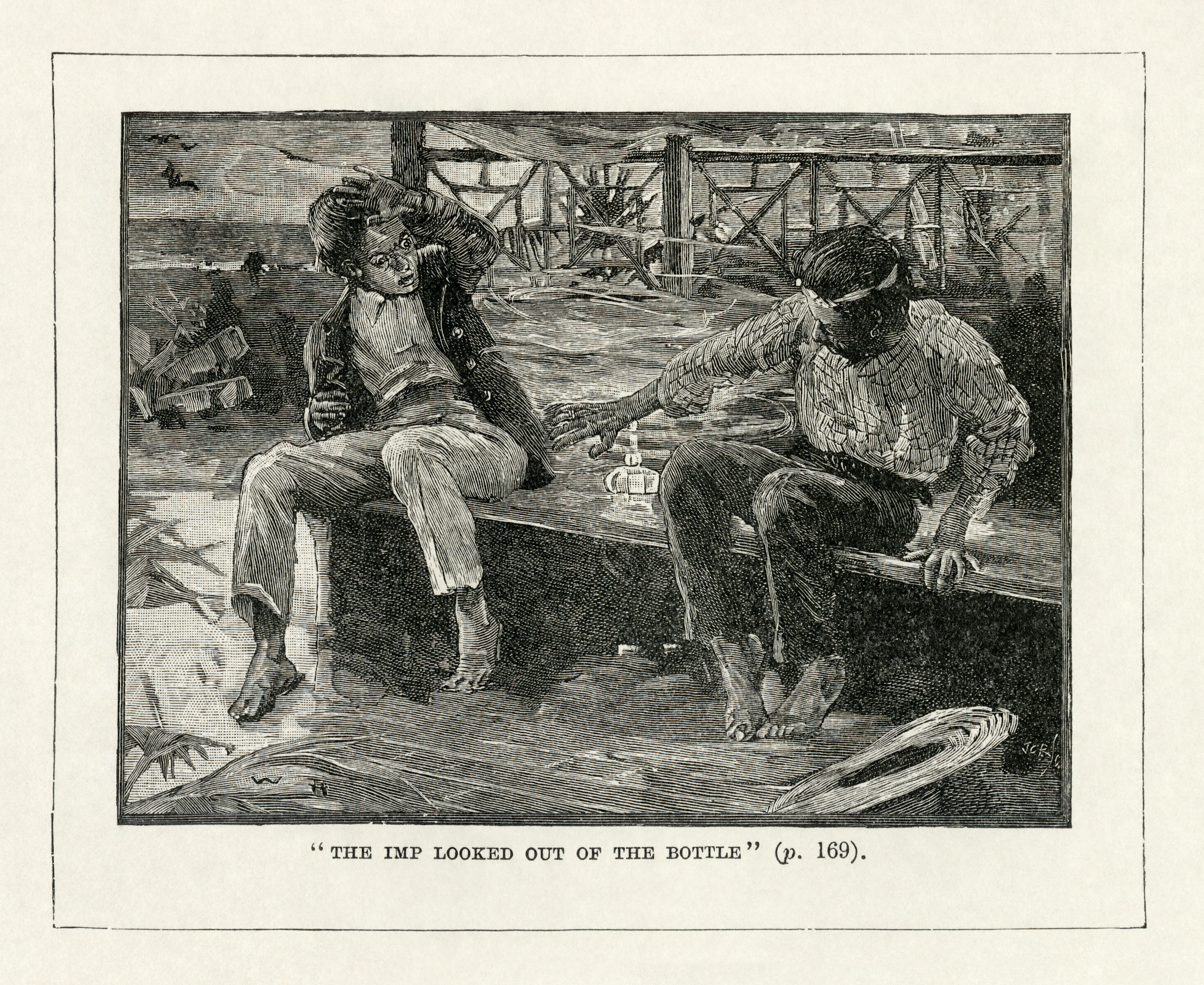
"The Imp Looked out of the Bottle", illustration by W. Hatherell

Keawe buys the bottle and instantly tests it by wishing his money to be refunded, and by trying to sell it for more than he paid and abandoning it, to test if the story is true. When these all work as described, he realizes the bottle does indeed have unholy power. He wishes for his heart's desire: a big, fancy mansion on a landed estate, and finds his wish granted, but at a price: his beloved uncle and cousins are killed in a boating accident, leaving Keawe sole heir to his uncle's fortune. Keawe is horrified, but uses the money to build his house. Having all he wants, and being happy, he explains the risks to a friend who buys the bottle from him.

Keawe lives a happy life, but there is something missing. Walking along the beach one night, he meets a beautiful woman, Kokua. They soon fall in love and become engaged. Keawe's happiness is shattered on the night of his betrothal, when he discovers that he has contracted the then-incurable disease of leprosy. He must give up his house and wife, and live in Kalaupapa—a remote community for lepers—unless he can recover the bottle and use it to cure himself.

Keawe begins this quest by attempting to track down the friend to whom he sold the bottle, but the friend has become suddenly wealthy and left Hawaii. Keawe traces the path of the bottle through many buyers and eventually finds a haole in Honolulu. The man of European ancestry has both good and bad news for Keawe: (a) he owns the bottle and is very willing to sell, but (b) he had only paid two cents for it. Therefore, if Keawe buys it, he will not be able to resell it.

Keawe decides to buy the bottle anyway, for the price of one cent, and indeed cures himself. Now, however, he is understandably despondent: how can he possibly enjoy life, knowing his doom? His wife mistakes his depression for regret at their marriage, and asks for a divorce. Keawe confesses his secret to her.

His wife suggests they sail, with the bottle, to Tahiti; on that archipelago the colonists of French Polynesia use centimes, a coin worth one fifth of an American cent. This offers a potential recourse for Keawe.

When they arrive, however, the suspicious natives will not touch the cursed bottle. Kokua determines to make a supreme sacrifice to save her husband from his fate. Since, however, she knows he would never sell the bottle to her knowingly, Kokua is forced to bribe an old sailor to buy the bottle for four centimes, with the understanding that she will secretly buy it back for three. Now Kokua is happy, but she carries the curse.

Keawe discovers what his wife has done, and resolves to sacrifice himself for her in the same manner. He arranges for a brutish boatswain to buy the bottle for two centimes, promising he will buy it back for one, thus sealing his doom. However, the drunken sailor refuses to part with it, and is unafraid of the prospect of Hell. "I reckon I'm going anyway," he says.

Keawe returns to his wife, both of them free from the curse, and the reader is encouraged to believe that they live happily ever after.

== Background ==
The theme of the bottle imp can be found in a German legend published as "Spiritus familiaris" in the Brothers Grimm's collection Deutsche Sagen. This legend was the basis for Richard Brinsley Peake's 1828 play The Bottle Imp, which Stevenson acknowledged as a source for his own story. (Stevenson ascribes the play to "O. Smith"—presumably its star, Richard John Smith; his wife, Fanny, to Edward Fitzball.) Stevenson's imp furthermore resembles the bottled genie from One Thousand and One Nights.

Stevenson's tale reflects the impressions he gained during a five-month visit of the Kingdom of Hawaii in 1889. Part of the storyline takes place in the little town Hoʻokena at the Kona coast of the island of Hawaii, which the author visited. In a scene which takes place in Honolulu Stevenson mentions Heinrich Berger, the bandmaster of the Royal Hawaiian Band. The name of Keawe's wife refers to the Hawaiian word kōkua, which means help. In 1889 Stevenson also visited the leper colony on the island of Molokaʻi and met Father Damien there. Therefore, he had a first-hand experience from the fate of lepers. Several times Stevenson uses the Hawaiian word Haole, which is the usual term for Caucasians, for example describing the last owner of the bottle. When "The Bottle Imp" was published in 1891, the currency system of the Kingdom of Hawaii included cent coins that circulated at par with the U.S. penny.

The story may be considered as both a continuation of and a light-hearted counterpoint to the theme of selling one's soul to The Devil, manifested in the numerous depictions of Doctor Faust as well as in such stories as "The Devil and Tom Walker" by Washington Irving and "The Devil and Daniel Webster" by Stephen Vincent Benét.

== Publication ==
1891 saw the serialized publication of "The Bottle Imp." This occurred both in English—first appearing in the 28 March 1891 issue of Black & White—and in Samoan translation by Misi Talatonu with the title "O Le Tala I Le Fagu Aitu"—first appearing in the May issue of the missionary magazine O le sulu Samoa (The Samoan Torch). In the former, Stevenson offers an introductory note indicating that "the tale has been designed and written for a Polynesian audience..."

== Bottle Imp paradox ==
The premise of the story creates a logical paradox similar to the unexpected hanging paradox. Clearly no rational person would buy it for one cent as this would make it impossible for it to be sold at a loss. However, it follows that no rational person would buy it for two cents either if it is later to be sold only to a rational person for a loss. By backward induction, the bottle cannot be sold for any price in a perfectly rational world. And yet, the actions of the people in the story do not seem particularly unwise.

The story shows that the paradox could be resolved by the existence of certain characters:

- Someone who loves the bottle's current owner enough to sacrifice their own soul for that person.
- Someone who believes they are inevitably destined for Hell already.
- Someone who believes there is someone else willing to make an irrational decision to purchase the bottle.

Since the exchange rates of different currencies can fluctuate with respect to one another, it is also possible that the value of the bottle could increase from one transaction to the next even if the stated price decreases. This leads to an endless staircase-type paradox which would make it possible, in theory, for the bottle to keep getting sold infinitely many times. However, this might be forbidden depending on how the bottle imp interprets the idea of "selling at a loss".

== Adaptations ==
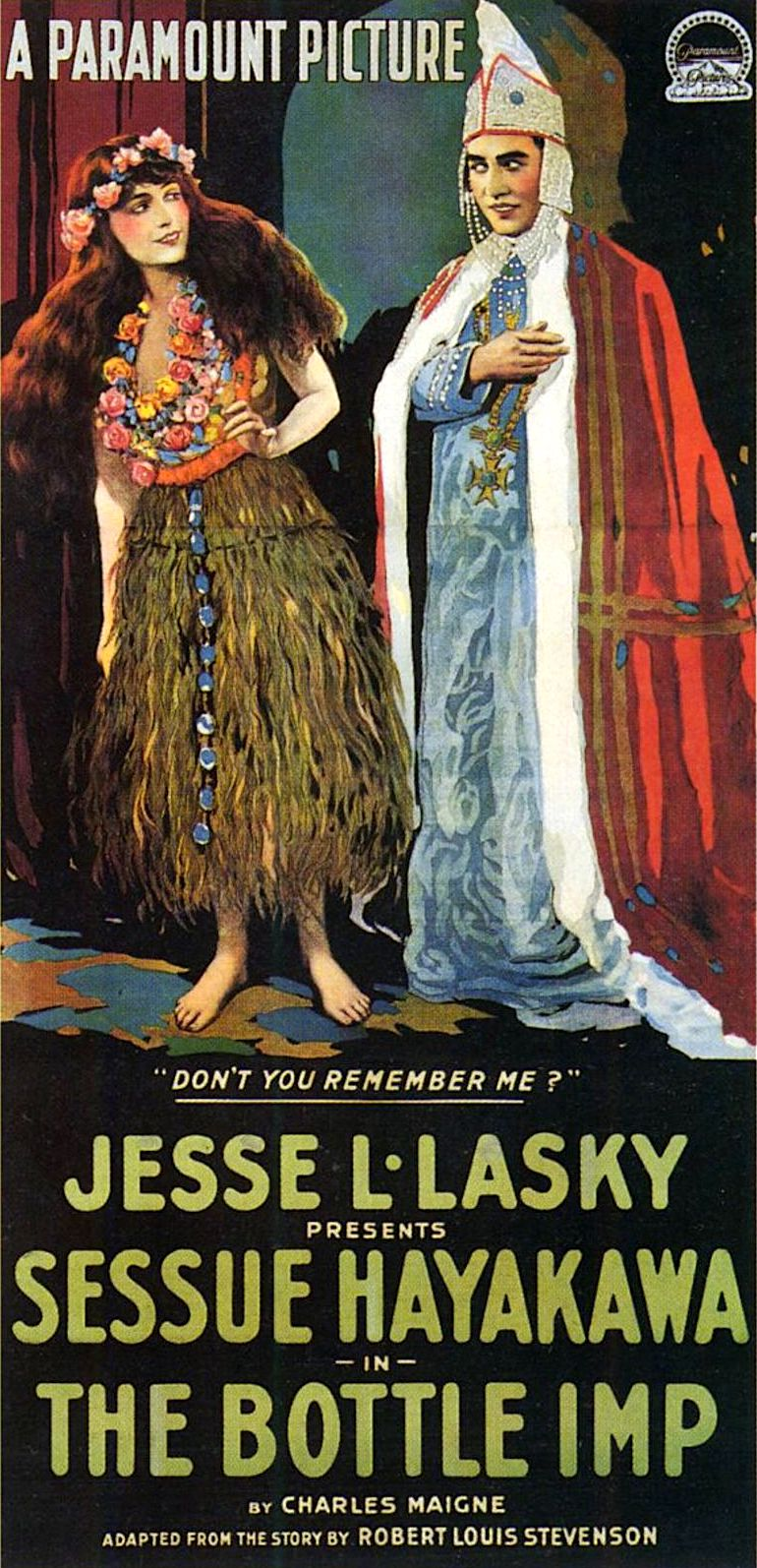
A poster for the 1917 film

=== Cinema ===
A lost silent film based on Stevenson's story was released in 1917. The screenplay was adapted by Charles Maigne. The film was directed by Marshall Neilan, and starred Sessue Hayakawa, Lehua Waipahu, H. Komshi, George Kuwa, Guy Oliver and James Neill.

Käthe von Nagy starred in the German film Love, Death and the Devil (1934) and the French film The Devil in the Bottle (1935), both based on the story.

West German filmmakers the Diehl Brothers used the story as the basis for a feature film shot with a mixture of puppetry and live action, released in 1952 under the title Der Flaschenteufel.

=== Television ===
An Italian TV adaptation, "Il diavolo nella bottiglia", aired on Rai 2 on 23 June 1981 as part of the horror anthology series I giochi del diavolo.

=== Radio ===
The Witch's Tale, a horror anthology radio series, adapted the story as "The Wonderful Bottle" in 1934.

"The Imp in the Bottle" was episode number 143 of the CBS Radio Mystery Theater which aired in 1974.

BBC Radio 4 broadcast an audio adaptation of the story in 1994, narrated by David Rintoul and featuring Tony Osoba and Nina Wadia.

=== Opera ===
The Devil Inside, an opera based on Stevenson's short story written by the novelist Louise Welsh and the composer Stuart MacRae, premiered at the Theatre Royal, Glasgow in January 2016. The opera was a co-production between Scottish Opera and Music Theatre Wales.

=== Games ===
The story has inspired the trick-taking card game Bottle Imp, designed by Günter Cornett. It was first published in 1995 by Bambus Spieleverlag, and has been republished several times since.

== See also ==
- Greater fool theory
- Unexpected hanging paradox
