= Life's Little Ironies =

1894 collection of tales by Thomas Hardy

- First edition (publ. Osgood, McIlvaine and Co.)
- Author: Thomas Hardy
- Language: English
- Publication date: 1894

Life's Little Ironies is a collection of tales written by Thomas Hardy, originally published in 1894, and republished with a slightly different collection of stories, for the Uniform Edition in 1927/8.

Life's Little Ironies was published by Osgood, McIlvaine and Co. on 22 February 1894. The American edition was published by Harper & Brothers in March 1894. All the stories in the collection had previously appeared in serialised form.

== 1927 edition contents ==
- An Imaginative Woman
- The Son's Veto
- For Conscience' Sake
- A Tragedy Of Two Ambitions
- On the Western Circuit
- To Please His Wife
- The Fiddler of the Reels
- A Few Crusted Characters—
  - Introduction
  - Tony Kytes, the Arch-Deceiver
  - The History of the Hardcomes
  - The Superstitious Man's Story
  - Andrey Satchel and the Parson and Clerk
  - Old Andrey's Experience as a Musician
  - Absent-Mindedness in a Parish Choir
  - The Winters and the Palmleys
  - Incident in the Life of Mr. George Crookhill
  - Netty Sargent's Copyhold

There is a Prefatory Note to the revised edition, written by the author, which says this of the above contents: “Of the following collection the first story, ‘An Imaginative Woman’, originally stood in Wessex Tales, but was brought into this volume as being more nearly its place, turning as it does upon a trick of Nature, so to speak, a physical possibility that may attach to a wife of vivid imaginings, as is well known to medical practitioners and other observers of such manifestations. The two stories named ‘A Tradition of Eighteen Hundred and Four’ and 'The Melancholy Hussar of the German Legion’, which were formerly printed in this series, were also transferred to Wessex Tales, where they more naturally belong. The above alterations were first made in the Uniform Edition in 1927. The present narratives and sketches, though separately published at various antecedent dates, were first collected and issued in a volume in 1894. T.H.”

The original collection came out as a pocket edition in 1907 (reprinted nine times); the 1927 revision was reset and issued 1928 (reprinted 1929, 1937, 1953). Six of the stories (excluding "To Please His Wife" and "A Few Crusted Characters") appeared in the Penguin Classic The Fiddler of the Reels and Other Stories.

== Film and TV adaptations ==
Two of the short stories were adapted as one-off TV dramas by the BBC in the 1973 anthology Wessex Tales:

- A Tragedy of Two Ambitions (21 November 1973 / BBC2)
- An Imaginative Woman (28 November 1973 / BBC2).
