= The Bottle Imp (film) =

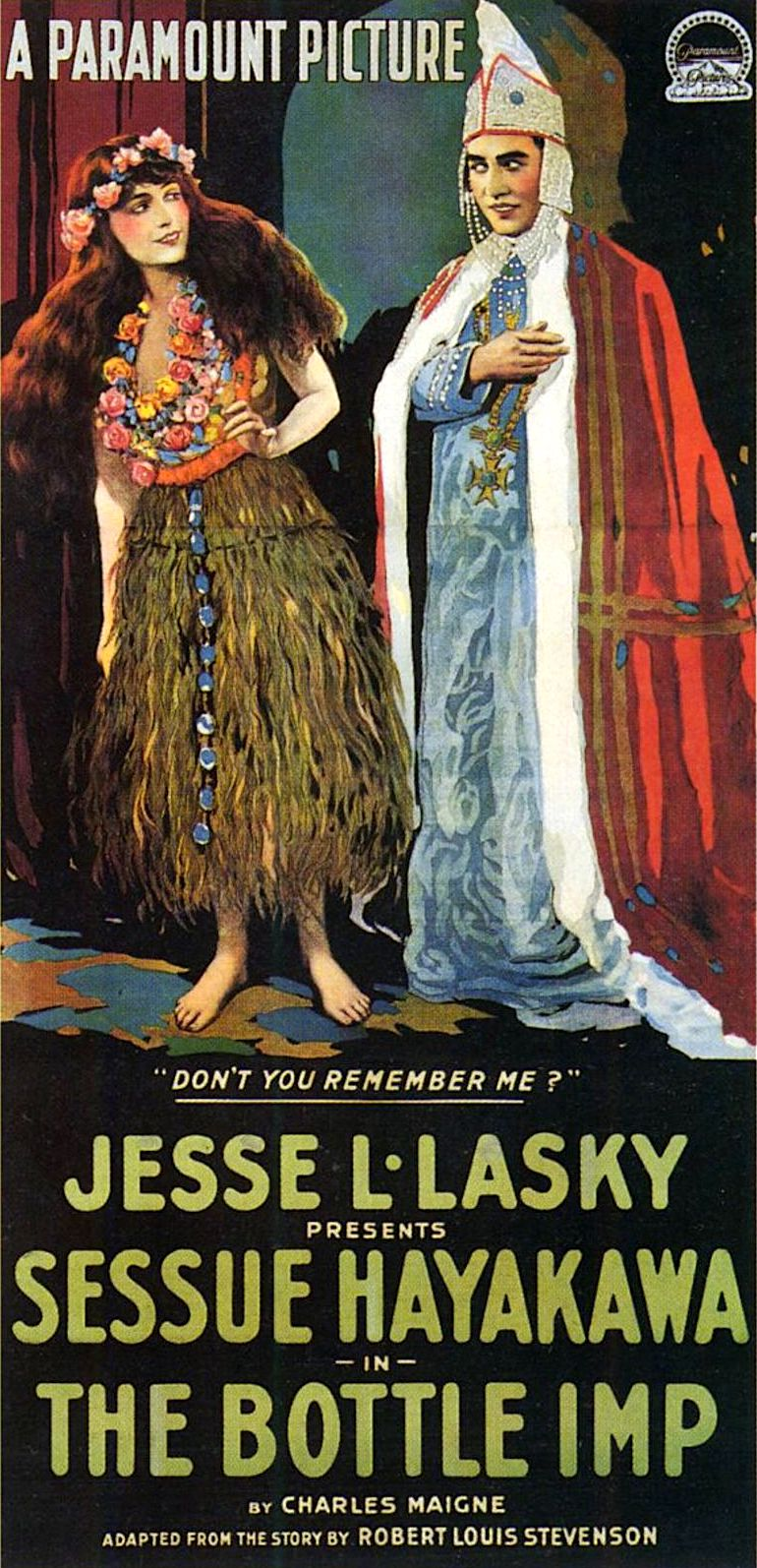
- Theatrical release three-sheet poster
- Directed by: Marshall Neilan
- Written by: Charles Maigne (scenario)
- Based on: "The Bottle Imp" by Robert Louis Stevenson
- Produced by: Jesse L. Lasky
- Cinematography: Walter Stradling
- Production company: Jesse L. Lasky Feature Play Company
- Distributed by: Paramount Pictures
- Release date: March 26, 1917
- Running time: 50 minutes (5 reels)
- Country: United States
- Language: Silent (English intertitles)

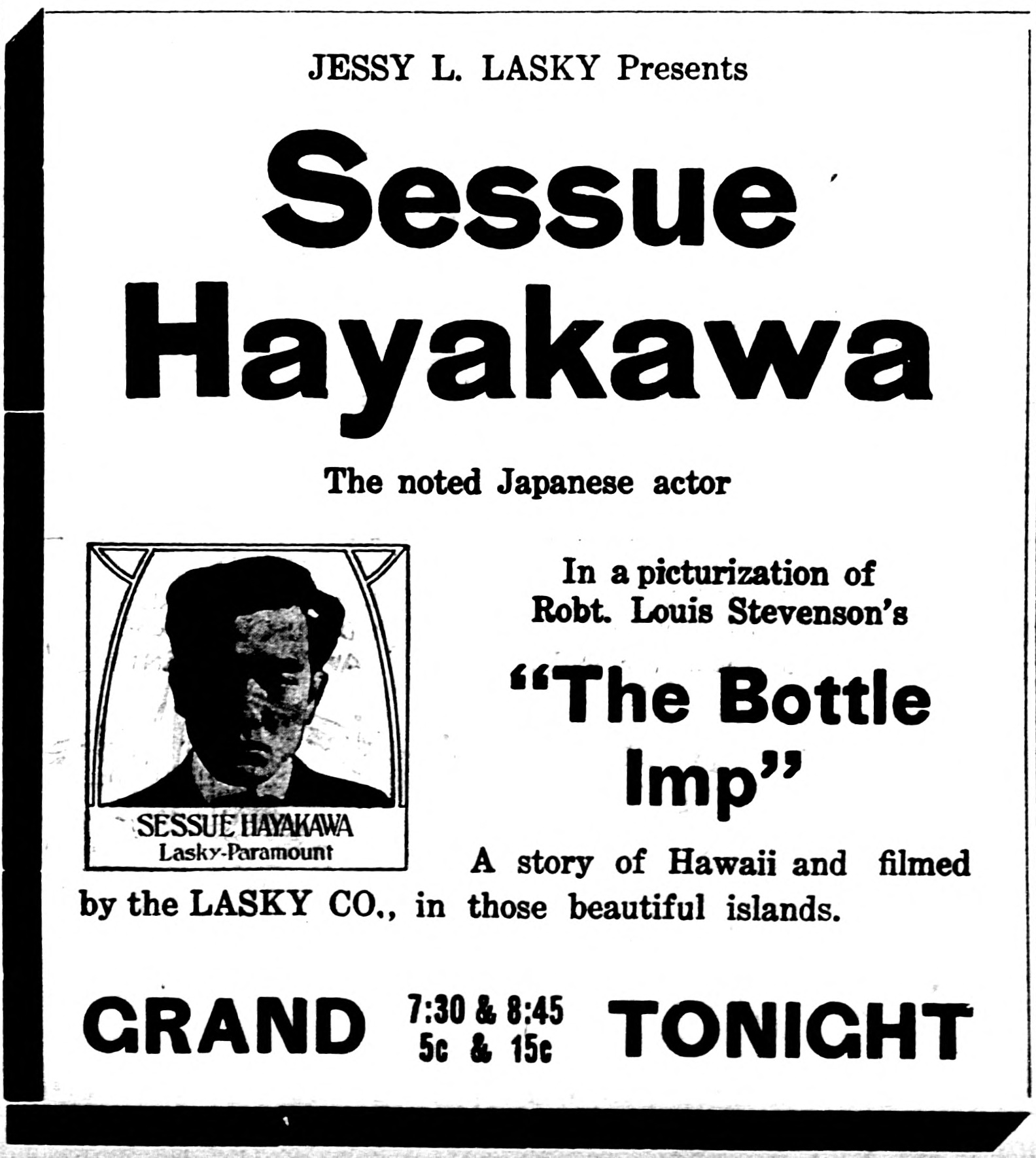
An advertisement for the film.

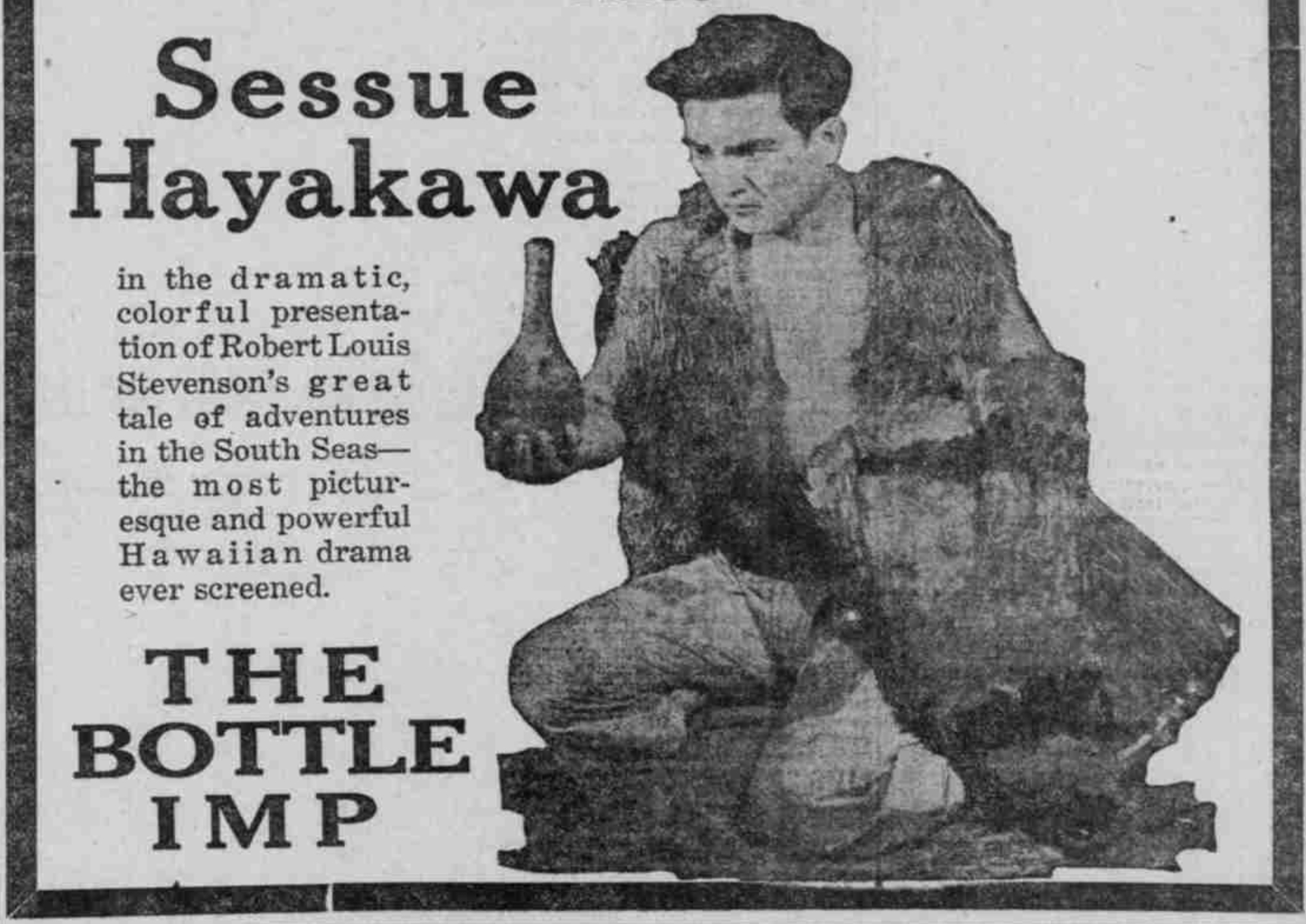
The Bottle Imp advertisement of April 22, 1917

The Bottle Imp is a 1917 American silent fantasy film produced by Jesse L. Lasky and distributed through Paramount Pictures. It is taken from the Robert Louis Stevenson short story, "The Bottle Imp". The movie was directed by Marshall Neilan in Hawaii and stars Japanese actor Sessue Hayakawa.

Prints are held by the George Eastman Museum and Cinémathèque française, Paris.

== Cast ==
- Sessue Hayakawa as Lopaka
- Lehua Waipahu as Kokua
- H. Komshi as Keano
- George Kuwa as Makale
- Guy Oliver as Rollins
- James Neill as Priest
