= Bottle Imp (card game) =

The Bottle Imp (or Flaschenteufel) is a trick-taking card game designed by Günter Cornett and based on the Robert Louis Stevenson short story “The Bottle Imp”. It was first published in 1995 by Bambus Spieleverlag, and was re-released by Z-Man Games in 2010 under the name "Bottle Imp." It was re-published again by Stronghold Games in 2018.

== Rules ==
The game is played with a bottle token and a proprietary deck of thirty-seven cards with a total ordering from 1 to 37. A card will be one of three colors which act like suits and there is no trump.

At the beginning of the game, the token is not attached to any player. Card #19 is the price of the bottle. The rest of the cards are dealt out equally to all players. After hands are dealt, each player discards one card, passes one card left and one card right.

The player to the left of the dealer leads the first trick. Players must play a matching color card if they have one, otherwise they may play any card. If a trick contains no cards lower than the price of the bottle then the highest card takes the trick. If a trick contains a card lower than the price of the bottle, then the highest card lower than the price takes the trick. That player gets the bottle token and the card used to win the trick becomes the new price. Tricks are led by the winner of the previous trick.

Players keep the cards won in tricks. Cards used to "purchase" the bottle are returned to the player who played them when a new price is set. Play continues until all cards are played.

At the end of the round, players who do not have the bottle score the face value of all cards they won. The player who ends the round with the bottle loses the sum of the cards discarded at the beginning of play. Play continues until a player reaches 500 points total.

The element of the bottle determines much of the strategy in the game: since it is harder to get rid of the bottle at a lower value than at a higher one, players will generally try to get rid of their lowest cards early on in the game when there is a better chance that someone else will play a higher card that is still lower than the bottle's value.
