= A Tragedy of Two Ambitions =

1894 short story by Thomas Hardy

"A Tragedy of Two Ambitions" is a short story by Thomas Hardy and was published in his collection Life's Little Ironies in 1894.

In this story, Hardy tells the story of two brothers who are so ambitious to get out of their social environment that they ignore moral values and willingly accept their father's death and hide all that from their sister.

The story is divided in five chapters and follows the dramatic structure of classical drama.

The story is set in Narrowbourne, which was Hardy's name for West Coker in Somerset.

== Summary ==
The story deals with the two brothers Joshua and Cornelius Halborough and their determination to better their lot in life, Joshua the elder being the driving force as opposed to his more compliant brother. The short story is set in the later part of the 19th century.

Reading the Epistle to the Hebrews in Greek the two boys Joshua and Cornelius are interrupted by their drunken father who used to be a respectable millwright but has become an alcoholic. They are dismayed by their father's behaviour and Joshua guides him to the straw-shed where he starts snoring. Previously their younger sister Rosa had tried to distract them from their studies but they have been ignoring her.

Joshua Halborough Senior used all the 900 pounds left for his two sons by their mother, who had previously died, for drinking. This left the boys unable to go to Oxford University, as their mother had planned, so they study in a training college for schoolmasters, where they get scholarships. Joshua borrows sufficient money from a local farmer to place his sister Rosa in a finishing school for several years.

A few years later Joshua is studying at the theological college where he is supported by his bishop and is going to be presented for ordination. He visits his brother Cornelius, who is a schoolmaster but Joshua is dismissive of this as an occupation and wants Cornelius to become a clergyman too. Joshua muses that he might have aspired to become a bishop had he been able to go to Oxford but is unlikely to achieve this now. Cornelius is easily persuaded that he should also become a clergy man. He tells Joshua that his father has recently called on him asking for money.

Both love their sister Rosa and want to help her have a good life. We are told that their somewhat harsh faces soften when they speak of her to each other. Joshua meets his father with his new wife when they turn up at his theological college. Joshua's father embarrasses him by approaching the sub-dean while he is the worse for drink, and Joshua doubts that his father really is married to the woman who accompanies him. Joshua is mortified by this incident and decides to raise enough money to send his father and supposed stepmother away to Canada.

Joshua, who is ordained by now, greatly impresses the congregation at Narrowbourne when he officiates the first time and is asked to dine with the local landowning Fellmer family. During dinner Mrs. Fellmer is surprised by Rosa's sophistication when she dines with them. She muses that had she known how pretty Rosa was she might not have invited her. Albert, Mrs. Fellmer's son, the Squire and a widower, is attracted by Rosa and wants to marry her. Joshua had not anticipated such an outcome to his educating Rosa and is delighted.

Everything seems to be going well for the Halborough family - Cornelius has been ordained and is now Vicar at Narrowbourne Joshua having taken a living elsewhere Then Cornelius comes to tell Joshua that his father has returned to England and is currently in a local jail after being sentenced for breaking a window while drunk. Fortunately the local newspaper has misspelled his surname. Rosa is not yet formally engaged to the Squire and the brothers fear that their father's inopportune return will ruin everything just when Mrs Fellmer has been brought round to approving the marriage. They decide to go to the town where there father is imprisoned and meet him after he is released from jail in an attempt to persuade him to go away again. The day before his release date the father has written to Cornelius stating his intention of coming to Narrowbourne to visit his daughter who he has heard will be making an advantageous marriage. He asks his sons to meet him in an inn six miles away. However, when the brothers arrive there their father has already left, reportedly in an intoxicated state.

The brothers hasten back to Narrowbourne and overtake their father who is drunk and quarrelsome. He tricks Joshua into drinking some raw spirits from a flask and taunts Joshua about having been illegitimate, his mother not having been married until after his birth, much to Joshua's mortification. He insists he will attend his daughter's wedding. He walks on ahead and falls into the weir. Cornelius leaps forward to rescue him but Joshua restrains him and both stand by and allow their father to drown. They do not say anything to anyone about what has occurred and wait for months for the body to be discovered. In the meantime, Rosa marries the Squire.

Six months later the body is found but it is unrecognisable. Cornelius can not bear to officiate at the burial service and sends for Joshua to do it instead. Their sister comes to visit and tells them that on the night of her engagement she heard someone calling her name and wonders whether it had anything to do with the unfortunate man who had drowned in the weir. After she leaves Cornelius expresses that he wants to confess everything to her but Joshua talks him out of this. The two brothers do not then see each other for a long while but meet again at the Christening of Rosa's son. Afterwards they are drawn back to the weir where their father drowned. Cornelius muses that he often thinks of suicide and Joshua replies that this thought has come to his mind also.

== Characters ==
Joshua and Cornelius Halborough:

Joshua and Cornelius are brothers and have a younger sister, Rosa. Their father, Joshua Halborough senior, is a millwright.

Rosa Halborough:

Rosa Halborough is the younger sister of Joshua and Cornelius. She is able to live a quite happy life because she is protected by her brothers. Her brothers talk about Rosa as an intelligent and beautiful young woman.
