= William Hatherell =

British painter and illustrator

- Born: 18 October 1855; Bristol, England
- Died: 7 December 1928 (aged 73); London, England

William Hatherell (18 October 1855, in Bristol – 7 December 1928, in London) was a British painter and illustrator who worked in the genres including historical painting, Arthurian legend, and sentimentalism.

== Biography ==
William Hatherell was born in Westbury-on-Trym, Bristol, on 18 October 1855. He studied art at the Royal Academy Schools from 1877 to 1879.

Occasionally he worked under the pen-name of W. Hatherell.

From the 1880s he created illustrations for magazines such as The Graphic and Harper's New Monthly Magazine. He became a member of the Royal Institute of Painters in Watercolours in 1888, and of the Royal Institute of Oil Painters in 1898. He joined the Langham Sketching Club in 1900. He became a member of the Royal West of England Academy, Bristol, in 1903, and of the American Society of Illustrators in 1905. He worked in genres including history painting, Arthurian legend, and the sentimental.

Hatherell illustrated a variety of books, making 22 watercolours for Hodder's edition of Shakespeare's Romeo and Juliet. He illustrated Thomas Hardy's "The Fiddler of the Reels" for Scribner's Magazine in 1893, and Jude the Obscure when it was brought out in twelve parts in Harper's New Monthly Magazine from December 1894 to November 1895.

He travelled to Australia on a commission from Cassell's to create illustrations for their 1890 book Picturesque Australasia. He returned to live in Brondesbury in northwest London, creating a garden that often forms the background in his paintings of the period.

In 1892 Hatherell did four color illustrations for the Uk edition of The Germ Growers, the world’s first Alien Invasion story.

In 1928 Hatherell was commissioned by Frederick Glasscock to paint ten scenes from Arthurian legend for King Arthur's Great Halls.

He died in London on 7 December 1928.

== Works ==
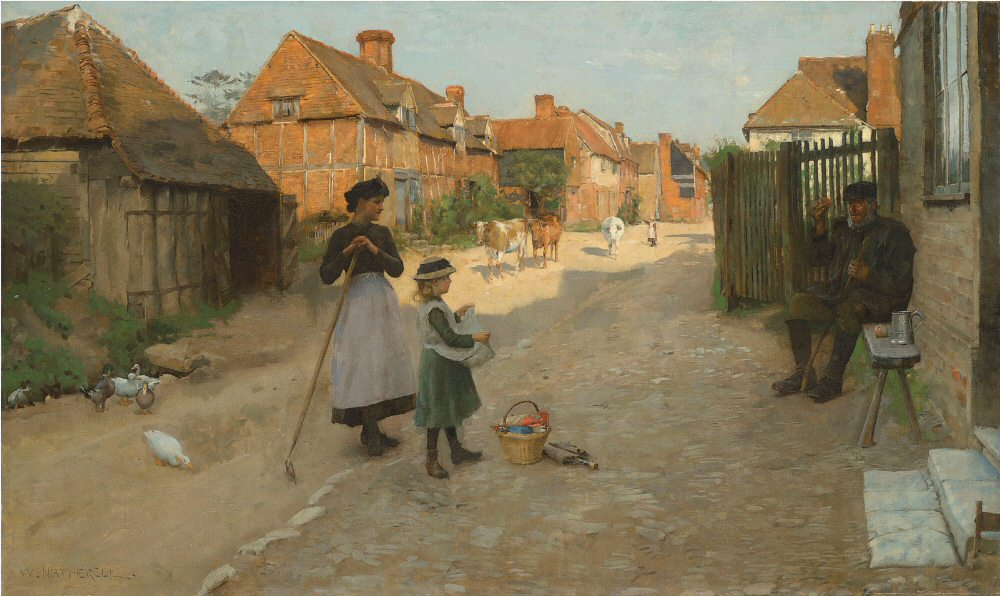
"Catch". Oil on canvas. n.d.

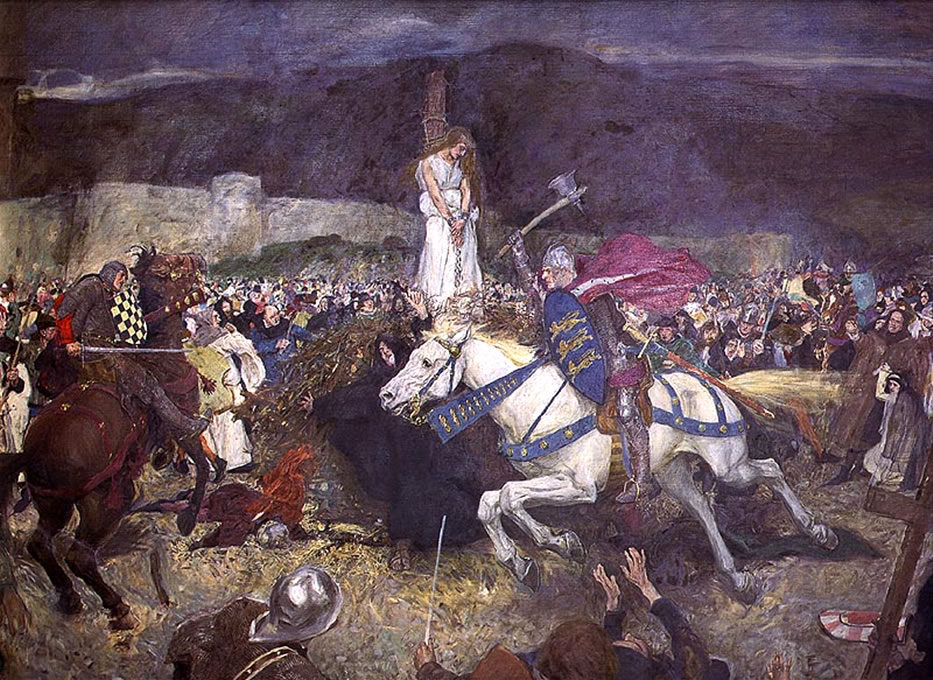
"The Rescue of Guinevere". Gouache, 1910

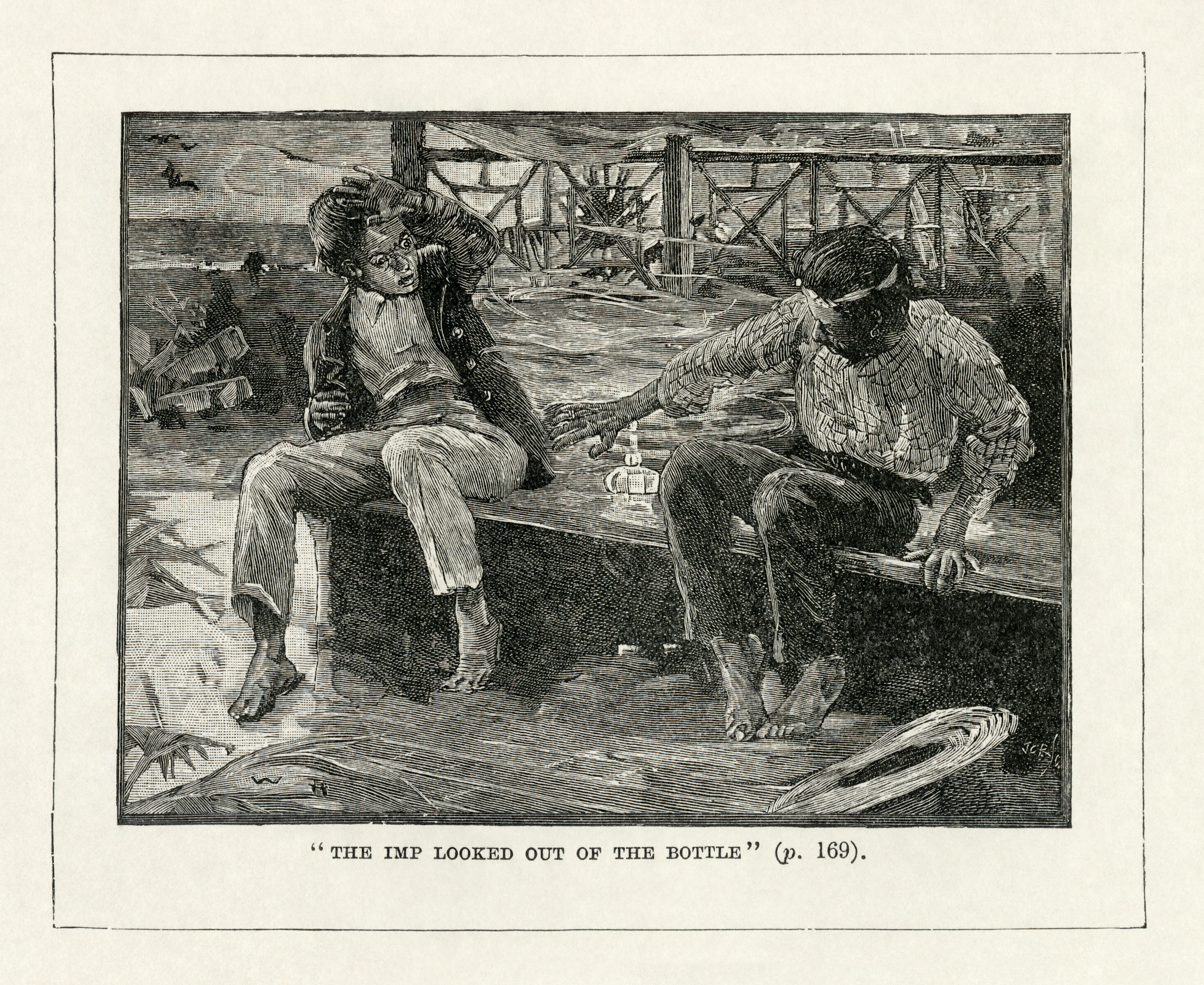
Illustration for The Bottle Imp by Robert Louis Stevenson, 1905

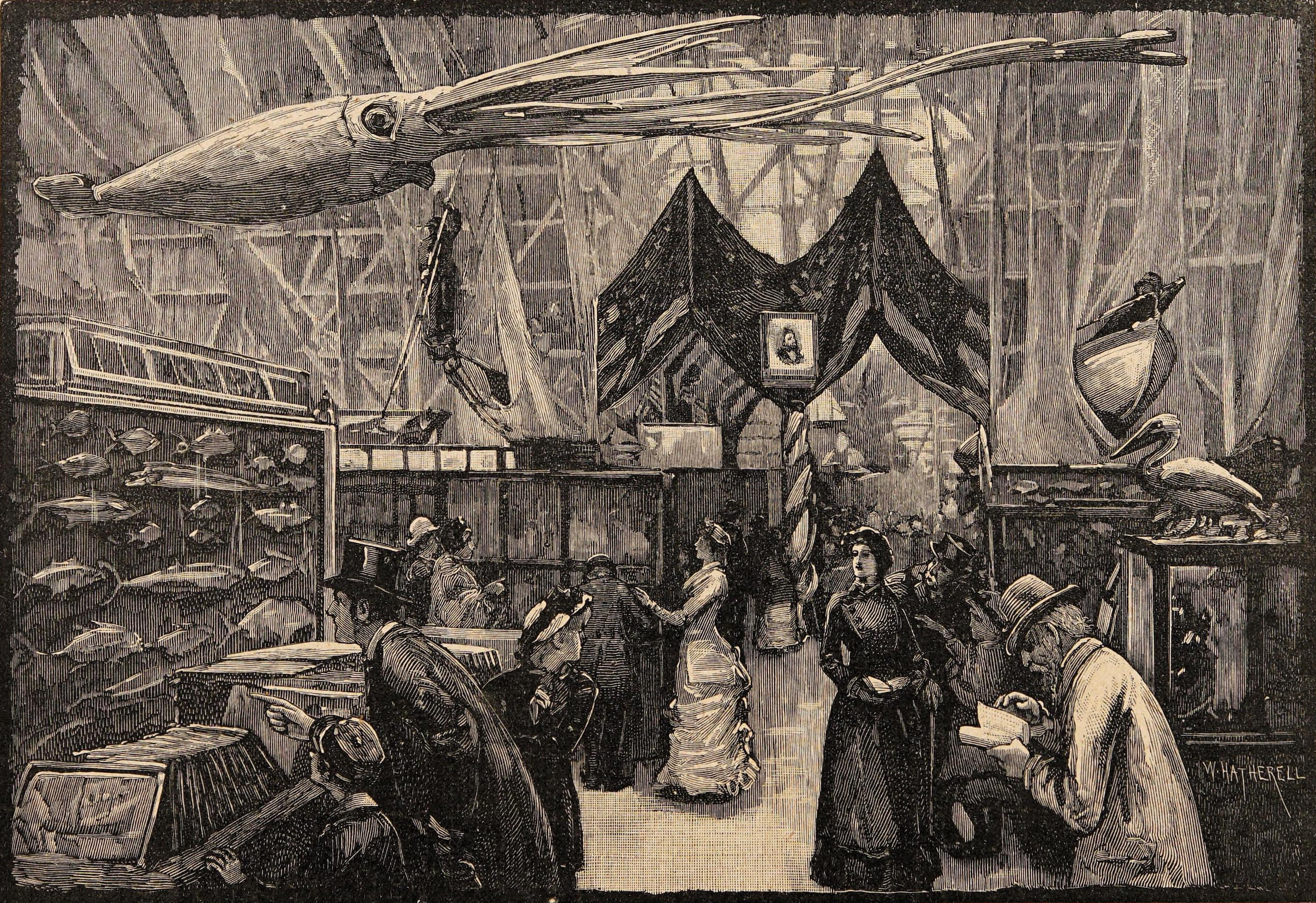
Illustration of the 1883 International Fisheries Exhibition, with a model of a giant squid, for Cassell's History of England, 1903

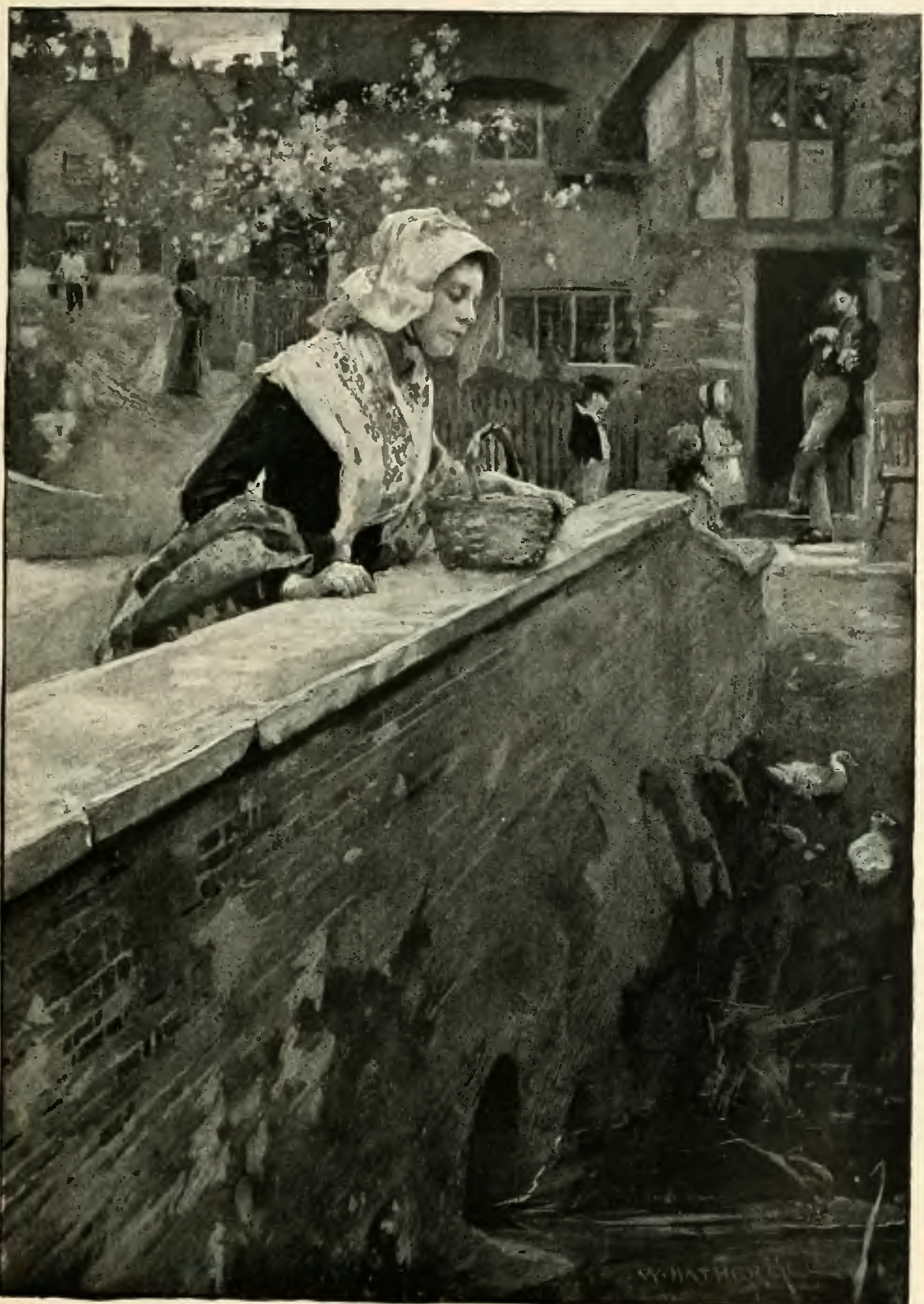
Illustration of Thomas Hardy's "The Fiddler of the Reels" for Scribner's Magazine, April 1893

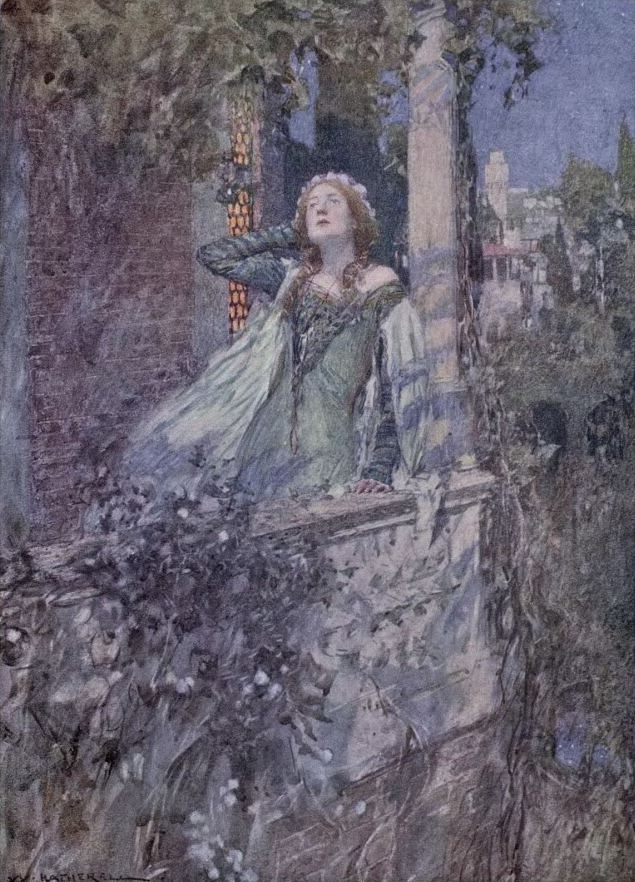
"Wherefore art thou Romeo?" Gouache, 1912

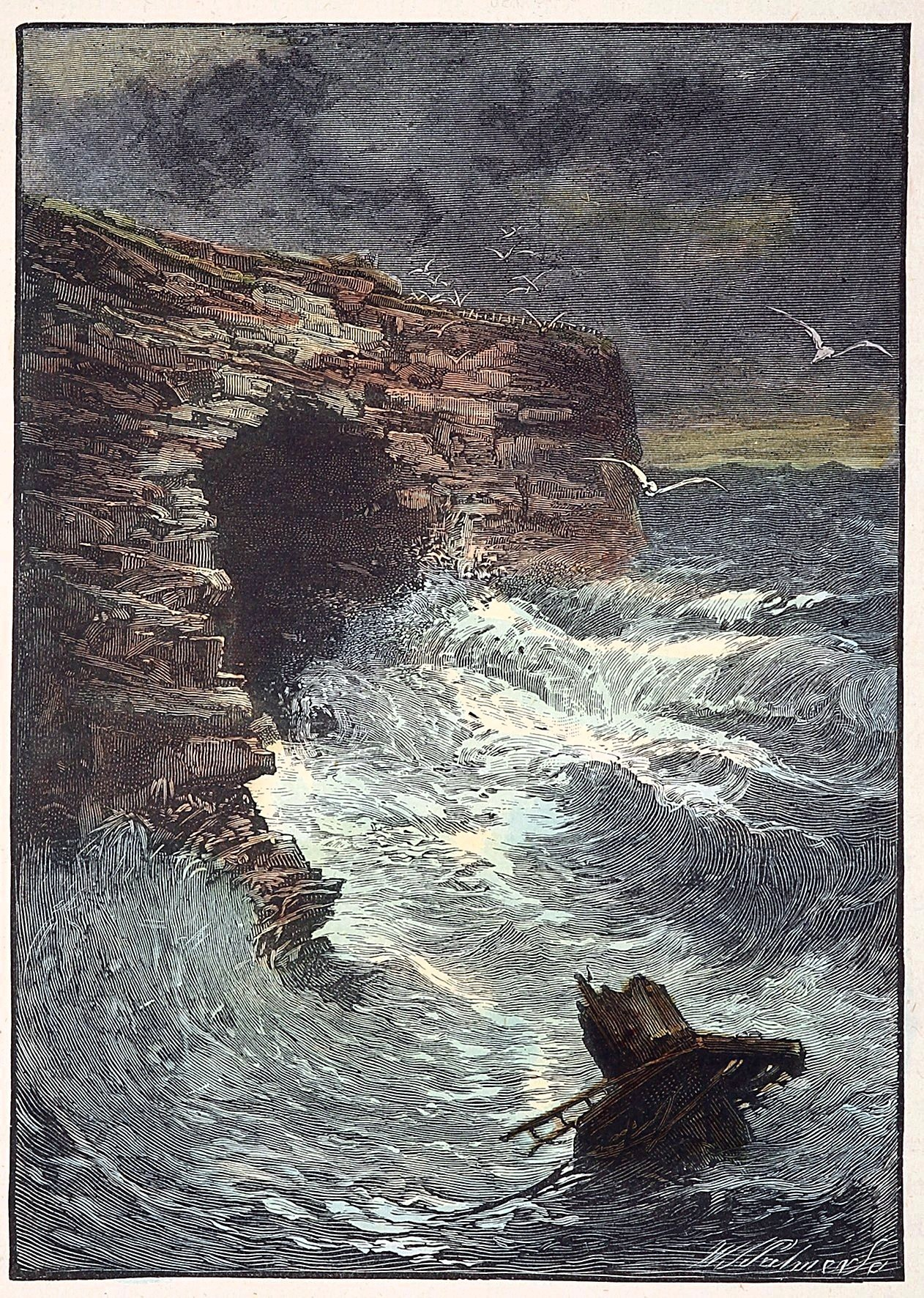
"The Gap", engraving from a watercolour, c. 1887

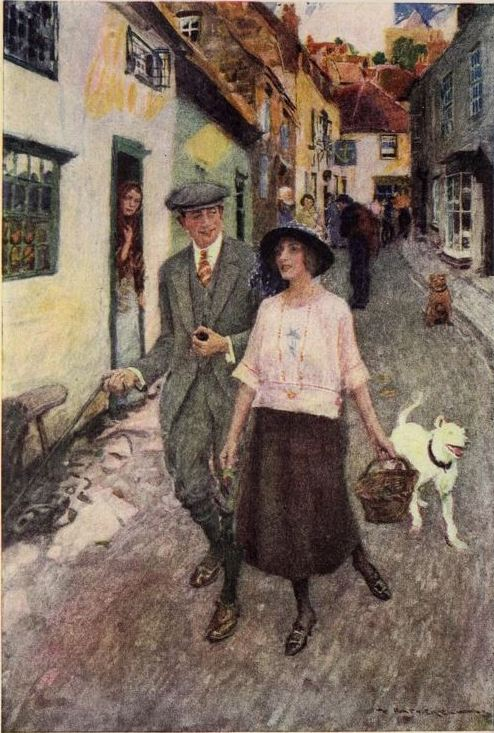
Painting to illustrate Mrs. Henry Dudeney's "The Embrace" for Harper's Magazine, February 1922
