= Charles James Hankinson =

English journalist and photographer

Charles James Hankinson, pen name: Clive Holland (23 April 1866, Bournemouth – 14 February 1959, London), was an English journalist and photographer.

== Biography ==
After attending Mill Hill School, he trained for the law. As Clive Holland, he began writing for boys' papers in 1887, and devoted himself entirely to journalism after 1893 writing for many of the leading papers and magazines. Hankinson also travelled widely and Eastern settings feature prominently in his work.

Hankinson lectured on France, Belgium, the English countryside of Hardy's novels, and other travel and literary subjects. He made many contributions to The Westminster Gazette and The Pall Mall Gazette and wrote a number of books. He wrote three novels in the genre of science fiction and fantasy: Raymi; Or, the Children of the Sun (1889), The Spell of Isis: A Romance of Egypt (1913), and The Hidden Submarine; Or, the Plot That Failed (1916). He wrote a book on photography and collected Japanese photographs, prints, and old books.

Hankinson married in 1894 and was the father of numerous children.

== Selected works ==
- 1896: The Lure of Fame (New Amsterdam)
- 1898: The Use of the Hand Camera
- 1901: Mousmé: a story of the West and East (Frederick A. Stokes Company)
- 1902: My Japanese Wife: a Japanese idyl (Frederick A. Stokes Company)
- 1904: A Japanese Romance
- 1906: Wessex (A. & C. Black)
- 1907: Things Seen in Japan (2nd ed. 1911)
- 1908: Things Seen in Egypt
- 1908: From the North Foreland to Penzance (Chatto & Windus)
- 1912: In the Vortex: a Latin Quarter romance (McBride, Nast)
- 1929: Things Seen in Normandy & Brittany (Seeley, Service)
