= Charles George Harper =

English author and illustrator

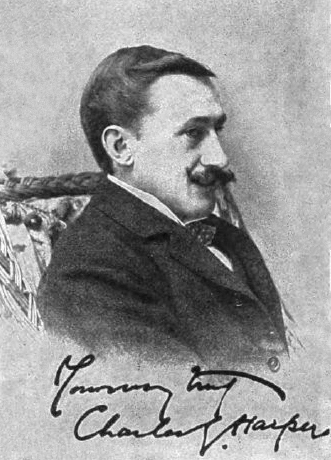
- Charles George Harper; Sketch magazine, 30 September 1896
- Born: 1863; Marylebone, London, England
- Died: 1943 (aged 79–80); Petersham, London, England
- Known for: Self-illustrated travel books
- Style: Pen drawing

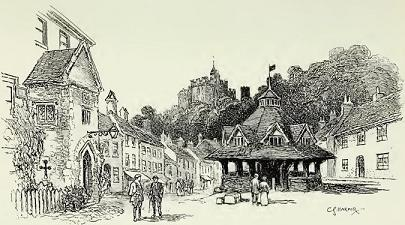
Dunster Castle and Yarn Market, from The Somerset Coast (1909)

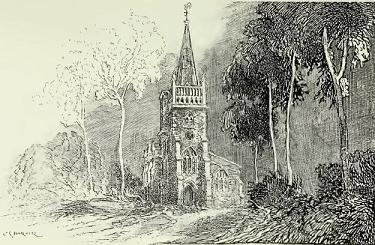
The old church in Kingston Seymour, from The Somerset Coast (1909)

Charles George Harper (1863–1943) was an English author and illustrator. Born in London, England, Harper wrote self-illustrated travel books, including those exploring the regions, roads, coastlines, literary connections, and old inns of Britain. In later life, he lived in Petersham.

Aside from the some 170 topographical works, he wrote a books on drawing and its techniques, including English Pen Artists of To-day (1892) and A Practical Handbook of Drawing for Modern Methods of Reproduction (1894), and, as an anti-feminist polemic, Revolted Woman; past, present, and to come (1894), and a satirical novel, Hearts Do Not Break: a Tale of the Lower Slopes (1896), attacking logrolling among the London literary set.

== Critical assessment ==
R. E. D. Sketchley's English Book-Illustration of To-Day (1903) characterised Harper's travel books as "... written and drawn with spirited observation. His drawing is not so picturesque as his writing. It has reticence and justness of expression that would not serve in relating tales of the road, but which, together with a sense of colour and of what is pictorial, combine to form an effective and frequently distinctive style of illustration".

N. W. Webster's article "The English traveller" (1974) describes him as "more a capable draughtsman than a creative artist, although his books would lose much without his delightful sketches".

== Published works (selected) ==
- Revolted Woman: past, present, and to come (London, Elkin Mathews, 1894).
- The Marches of Wales: notes and impressions on the Welsh borders, from the Severn Sea to the Sands o' Dee (London, Chapman & Hall, 1894).
- The Portsmouth Road (London, Chapman & Hall, 1896)
- Hearts Do Not Break: a Tale of the Lower Slopes (London, Kegan Paul & Co., 1896).
- The Exeter Road: The Story of the West of England Highway (London, Chapman & Hall, 1899).
- The Norwich Road: An East Anglian Highway (London, Chapman & Hall, 1901).
- The Holyhead Road (London, Chapman & Hall, 1902).
- Cycle Rides Round London (London, Chapman & Hall, 1902).
- The Hardy Country: literary landmarks of the Wessex novels (London, A. & C. Black, 1904).
- The Ingoldsby Country: literary landmarks of the "Ingoldsby legends" (London, A. & C. Black, 1904).
- The Newmarket, Bury, Thetford, and Cromer Road: Sport and History on an East Anglian Turnpike (London, Chapman & Hall, 1904).
- The Old Inns of Old England – Vol. 1, Vol. 2 (Chapman & Hall, 1906).
- The Hastings Road, and the "Happy Springs of Tunbridge" (Chapman & Hall, Ltd. 1906).
- Haunted Houses: Tales of the Supernatural: With Some Account of Hereditary Curses and Family Legends (1907).
- The South Devon Coast (Chapman & Hall, 1907).
- The North Devon Coast (Chapman & Hall, 1908).
- Half-Hours with the Highwaymen: Picturesque Biographies and Traditions of the "Knights of the Road" Vol. I, Vol. II (London, Chapman & Hall, 1908).
- The Smugglers: Picturesque Chapters in the Story of an Ancient Craft (London, Chapman & Hall, 1909).
- The Somerset Coast (Chapman & Hall, 1909).
- Thames Valley Villages – Vol. 1, Vol. 2 (Chapman & Hall, 1910).
- The Autocar Road Book Vol. 1: England South of the Thames (London, Methuen & Co., 1910).
- The Autocar Road Book Vol. 2: North and South Wales and West Midlands (London, Methuen & Co., 1911).
- The Autocar Road Book Vol. 3: East Anglia and East Midlands (London, Methuen & Co., 1912).
- The Autocar Road Book Vol. 4: North of England and South of Scotland (London, Methuen & Co., 1913).
- Summer Days in Shakespeare Land (J. Pott & Co., 1913).
- The Kentish Coast (Chapman & Hall, 1914).
- The Dover Road: annals of an ancient turnpike (Cecil Palmer, 1922).
- The Great North Road, the old mail road to Scotland (Charles Palmer, 1922).
- On the Road in Holland: notes and impressions in the quaint country of dykes and canals (Cecil Palmer, 1922).
