= Poole Harbour Trails =

Set of walks in Dorset, England

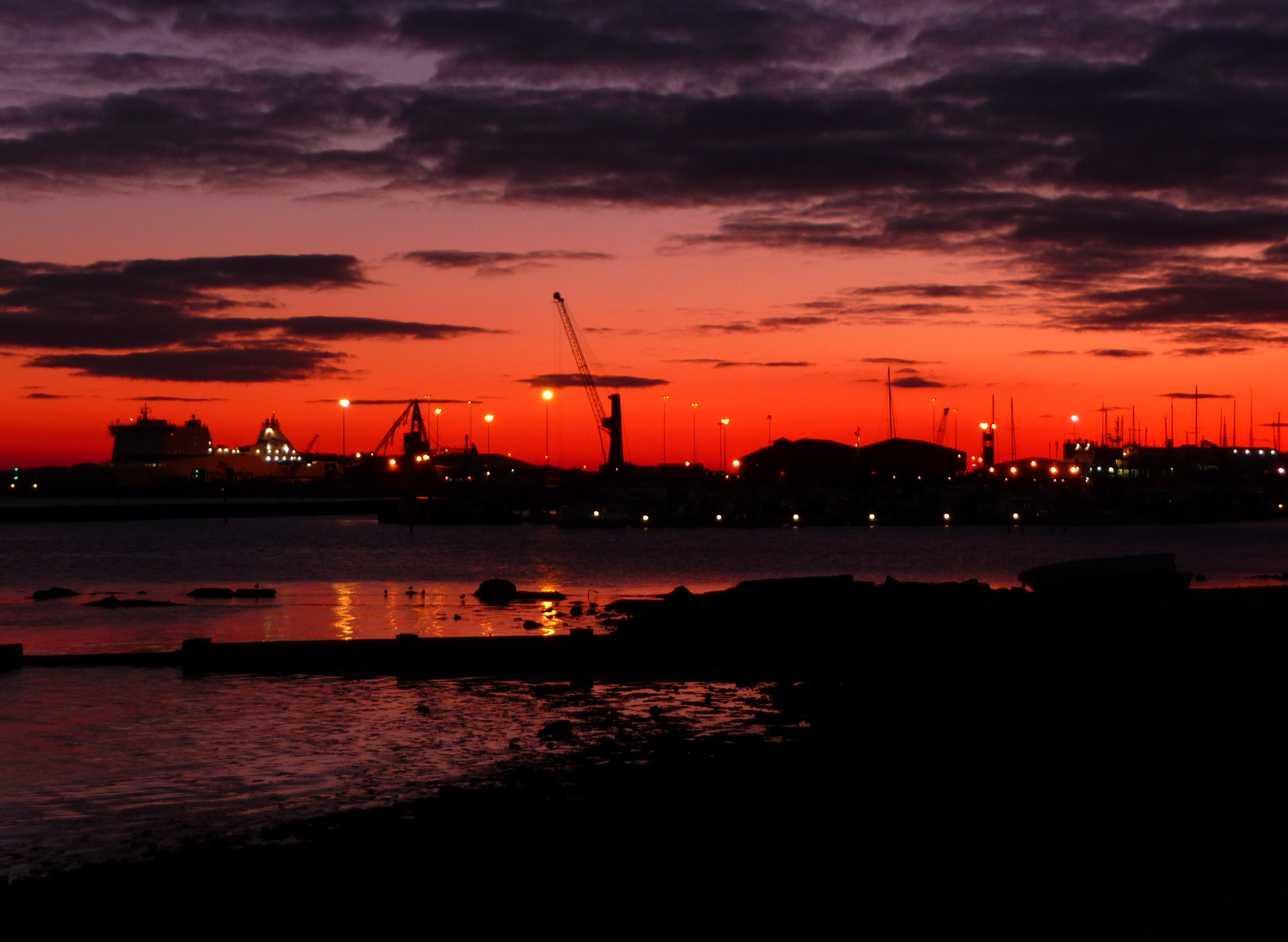
The view of the Port of Poole across Poole Harbour at dusk.

The Poole Harbour Trails comprise six linear walks that enable a complete circuit to be made of Poole Harbour on the south coast of England, which is said to be the second largest natural harbour in the world.

== Description ==
Poole Harbour is "a national treasure and provides access to some stunning countryside and woodland" as well as "wonderful views". The harbour and its environs are rich in wildlife and its towns and villages are "set in some of the best walking areas in South West England."

The trails consist of six linear walks making a complete circuit of this vast harbour. The walks are waymarked at key junctions. In addition there are 13 circular walks based on a viewing point or other point of interest.

Leaflets for each walk may be downloaded from the Poole Harbour Trails website.

== Linear walks ==
The six linear walks are:

- Walk 1 - Poole to Greenlands, 7.5 miles
- Walk 2 - Greenlands to Norden Park and Ride, 7 miles
- Walk 3 - Norden Park and Ride to Wareham, 7.5 miles
- Walk 4 - Wareham Quay to Sandford, 7.5 miles
- Walk 5b - Sandford to Turlin Moor, 8.5 miles
- Walk 5 - Future hopes for Walk 5 Sandford to Turlin Moor via Cordite Way and a new bridge
- Walk 6 - Turlin Moor to Poole Quay, 7 miles

== Circular walks ==
The 13 circular walks are:

- Walk 1a - Quay and Park, Poole, 3.8 miles, easy, 1hr 20 min
- Walk 1b - Poole Quay, Upton Country Park and Holes Bay, 5.5 miles, 3 hrs
- Walk 1c - Lilliput Footpaths, View Point and Evening Hill, 2.5 miles, 1-2 hrs
- Walk 2a - Greenlands Farm, Agglestone Rock and Studland, 4.5 miles, 2.5 hrs
- Walk 2b - Studland Heath, Shell Bay and Harbour's Edge, 6 miles, 3.5 hrs
- Walk 3a - Middlebere, Sharford Bridge and Wytch Farm, 4.5 miles, 2.5 hrs
- Walk 3b - Middlebere Farm and Sharford Bridge, 2.5 miles, 1.5 hrs
- Walk 3c - Middlebere, Hartland Moor, Scotland and Sharford Bridge, 6 miles, 3 hrs
- Walk 4a - Wareham station and West Mills, 4.5 miles, 2.5 hrs
- Walk 4b - Wareham station, Wareham Forest and Sika Trail, 4 miles, 2.5 hrs
- Walk 4c - Wareham Quay and Rivers Frome and Piddle, 4.5 miles, 2 hrs
- Walk 4d - Wareham Quay and Wareham Walls, 1.5 miles, 1 hr
- Walk 5a - Sandford and Organford, 5 miles, 3 hrs
- Walk 6a - Upton Country Park, Upton Heath and Roman Road, 5 miles, 3 hrs
- Walk 6b - Upton Country Park, Ham Common and Lytchett Bay, 7 miles, 3.5 hrs
