= The Pinnacles (Dorset) =

Coordinates: 50.6373°N 1.9271°W

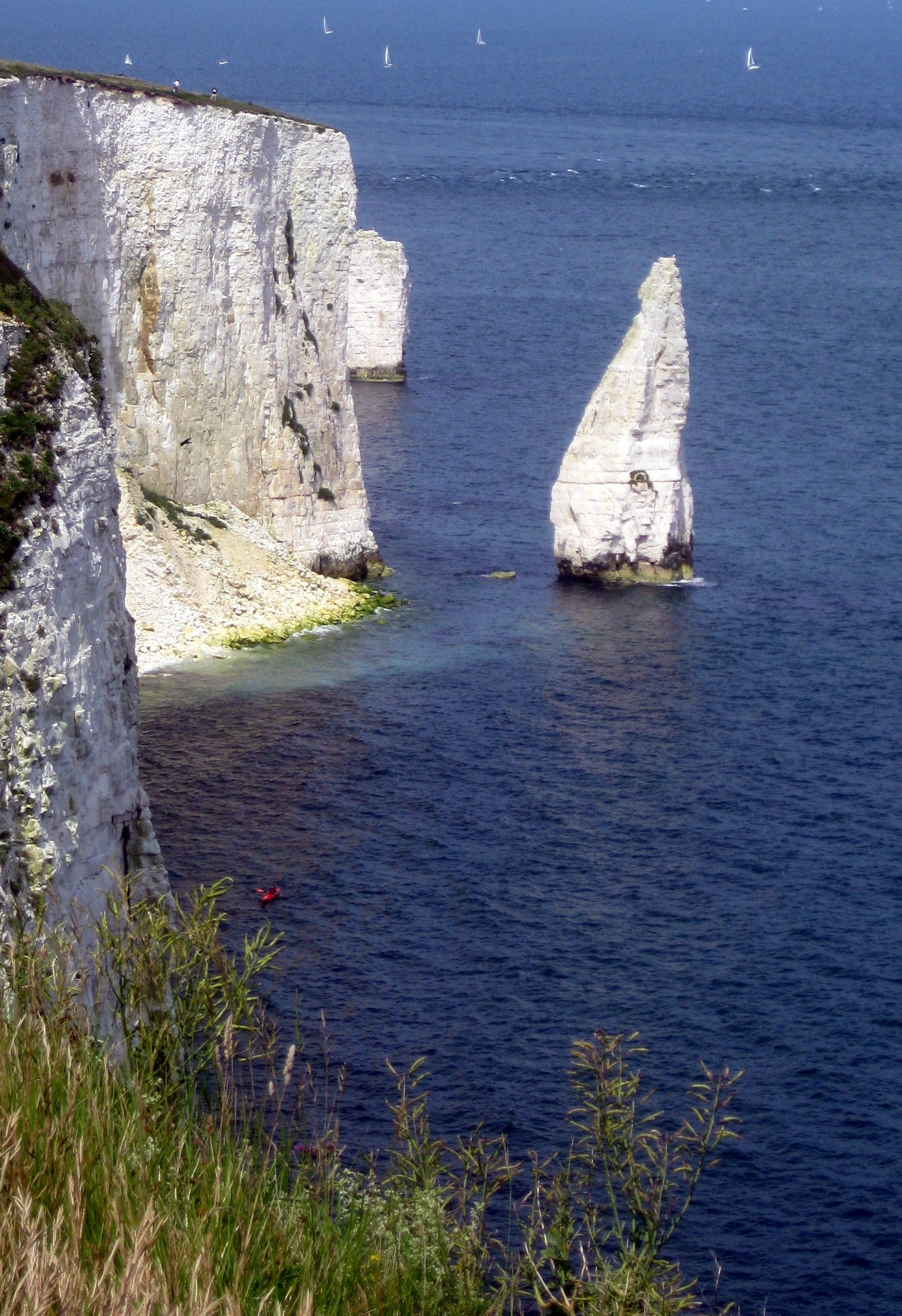
The Pinnacles

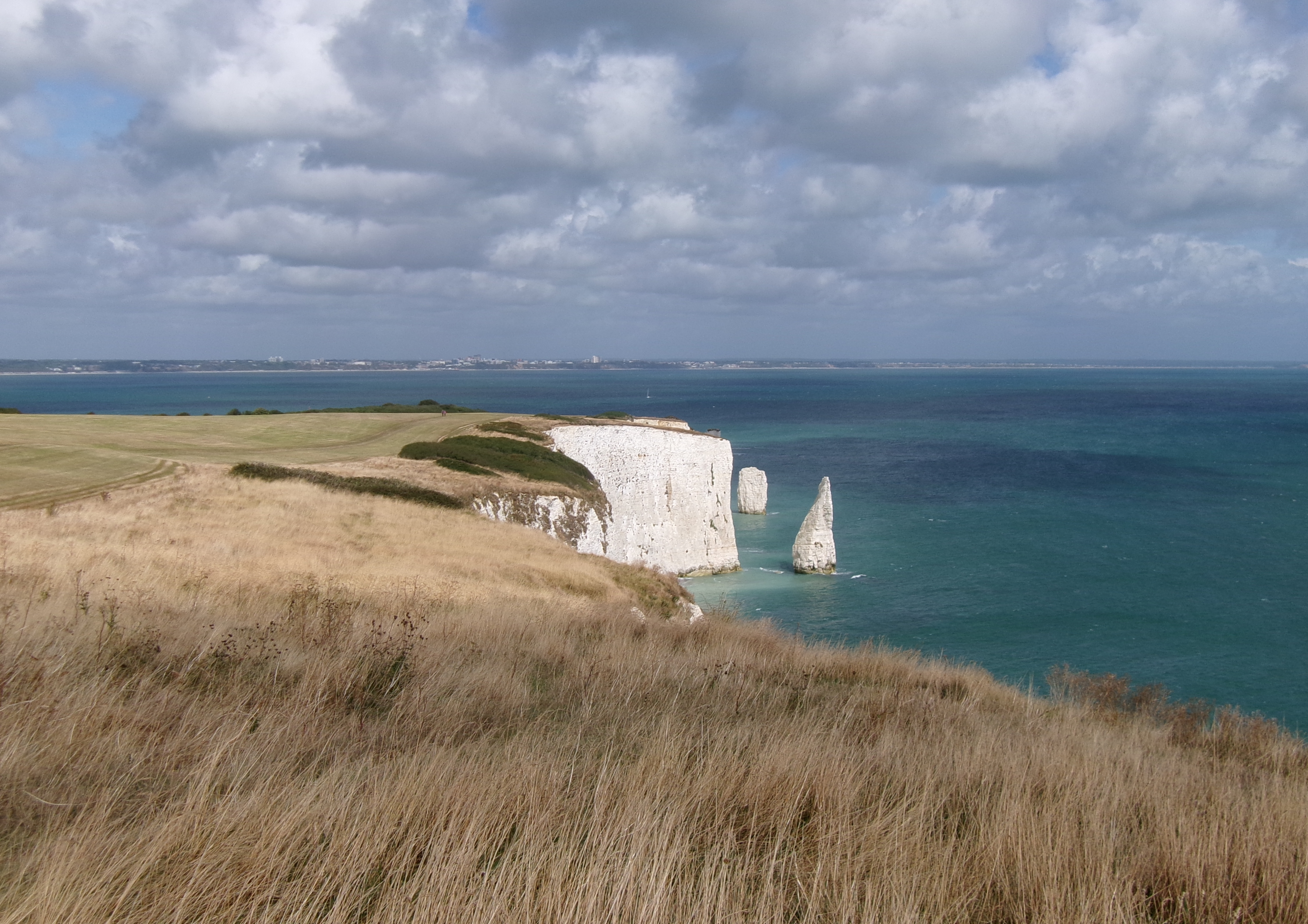
The Pinnacles

The Pinnacles are two chalk stacks located near Handfast Point, on the Isle of Purbeck in Dorset, southern England. The taller, more pointy stack, is named the Pinnacle, and is 33 metres (108 ft) tall; to its north is the shorter stack, named Little Pinnacle.

== Location ==
The Pinnacles lie directly east of Studland, approximately 200 metres south of Old Harry Rocks and about 4 kilometres northeast of Swanage. The chalk headlands of the Ballard Downs are owned by the National Trust. The rocks can be viewed from the Dorset section of the South West Coast Path.

== Geology and formation ==
About 65-100 million years ago, this region was home to a warm, shallow tropical sea. The chalk downlands of Ballard Down formed around 66 million years ago as a result of the build-up of the small, calcium-rich skeletons of microscopic algae found in the sea, called coccoliths. These eventually built up into thick bands as a result of compaction over millions of years. Thick bands of flint, with siliceous spicules of sponges, were present within these bands and offered some degree of structural strength to resist erosion. Eventually, due to tectonic activity, these layers of chalk rose above sea level. At this point a ridge of chalk existed to connect the Isle of Purbeck with the Isle of Wight, specifically the Needles. After the last Ice Age, due to rising sea levels and the breaching of this land bridge 7,000 to 10,000 years ago, these two landmasses were separated.

To form the stacks, the sea gradually eroded along the joints and bedding planes where the softer chalk meets harder bedrock of the rock formations to create a cave. This eventually eroded right through to create a natural arch. The arch subsequently collapsed to leave the stacks.

== Ecology ==
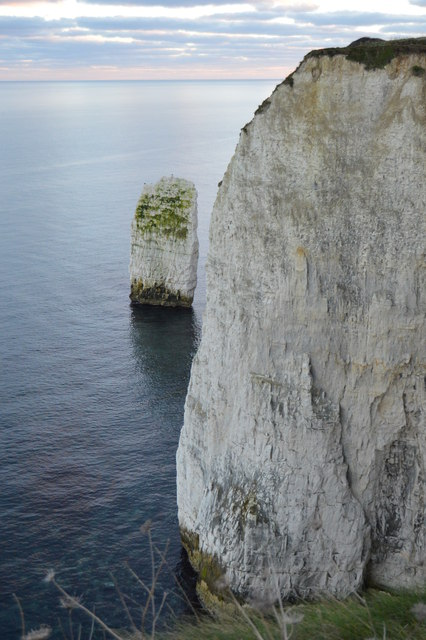
Little Pinnacle seen from the cliffs of Ballard Down near Handfast Point

The Pinnacles serve as a critical nesting site for several species. The Pinnacle South Cliff is an important breeding spot for cormorants, with up to 16 active cormorant nests.

Peregrine falcons are common on the stacks. They use these stacks as a nesting site as well as others in the area such as Durdle Door. Around 1900, the Pinnacle was a documented nesting site for peregrines, which used concealed holes at the summit to rear their young. Williams Masters Hardy visited the Pinnacle in 1910 and wrote:

Agglestone Rock has been the habitation of a pair of penegrine falcons for ages back. They rest and hunt there, but build their nest and rear their young on the top of Pinnacle Rock, near Old Harry. Their nest is artfully concealed in a hole in the summit, which has an opening at both ends, through one of which they enter, emerge at the other, the nest being most skilfully concealed from all nest seekersor destroyers of their own or any other species. The reason why these birds can be so seldom seen is because of their wonderful keen sight, for as soon as the "man with the gun" is observed at the most distant range, the birds swoop down from their aerial abode and wind their flight to their retreat to the Agglestone or some other isolated spot, long before the eye of the fowler has detected them.

Peregrines traditionally breed on the apex of the Pinnacle, which is in the shape of a triangle. Today, they can be found perched on top of the stack, hunting for pigeons and other small seabirds.

The stacks are also home to various species of fulmars, kittiwakes, guillemots, seagulls, and razorbills.

The base of the stack is home to a rich marine ecosystem, which is protected as part of the Studland to Portland Special Area of Conservation (SAC). The intertidal zone on the lower chalk areas is highly colonized by barnacles and limpets as a result of being exposed at low tide. Barnacles and limpets can also be found at the base of the stack on the wave-cut platform and in rock pools. Seaweed and various crab species are also found in the surrounding tidal areas. The surrounding waters within the subtidal areas are home to rocky reefs and seagrass beds within Studland Bay, which are used as nursery grounds for commercial fish species and seahorses.

== History ==
The Pinnacle has traditionally been a notable coastal feature for mariners to use when navigating the approaches to Poole Harbour from the east. Its shape has been a notable visual aid in a complex coastal landscape. The stack, along with Old Harry Rocks, has also been associated with the 14th-century pirate Harry Paye. Local folklore has it that the pirate hid his ship in the vicinity of the stacks and used the position to attack merchant vessels.

=== World War II ===
During World War II, the stacks were used by Spitfire and Hurricane pilots for target practice. Divers still occasionally find shell cases on the seabed nearby.

== Names ==
The "Pinnacle" name is derived from the tall, narrow, columnar shape of the structures.

Little Pinnacle has also been locally referred to as The Haystack, Turf Rickrock and The Wedge, which refer possibly to its rectangular and agricultural appearance.

The clifftop location above the stacks is named "Old Nick's Ground", which is derived from the traditional English term "Old Nick," meaning the Devil.

== Bibliography ==
- The Jurassic Coast Trust (2003). A Walk Through Time, the Official Guide to the Jurassic Coast. Coastal Publishing. ISBN 978-0-9544845-0-7.
