= Studland and Godlingston Heath National Nature Reserve =

Nature reserve in Dorset, England

Coordinates: 50.655°N 1.961°W

Studland and Godlingston Heaths SSSI
- Site of Special Scientific Interest
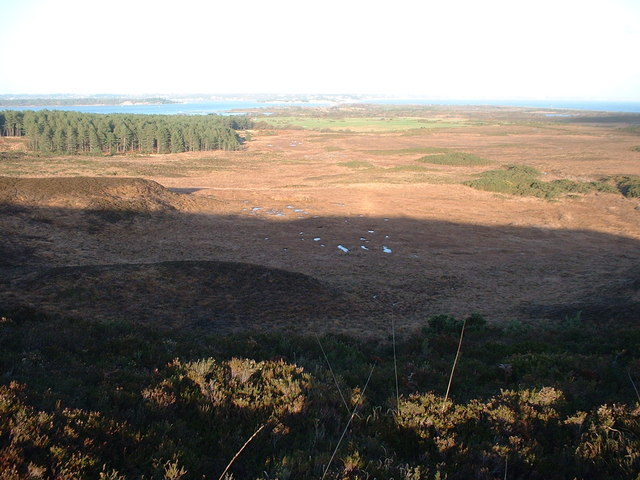
- View over Studland and Godlingston Heath
- Location of Studland and Godlingston Heaths SSSI.
- Area of search: Dorset
- Grid reference: SZ030845
- Interest: biological, historical, ornithological
- Area: 759 hectares (1,880 acres)
- Notification date: 1954

The Studland and Godlingston Heaths NNR is located on the Isle of Purbeck in the English county of Dorset. It borders Studland Bay on the south side of Poole Harbour, between the settlements of Swanage and Sandbanks. Extending to 631 ha, it is owned and managed by the National Trust following the Bankes bequest of the Kingston Lacy estate. Studland & Godlingston Heath is designated as one of only 35 "spotlight reserves" in England by Natural England in the list of national nature reserves in England and is listed as a Site of Special Scientific Interest (SSSI).

== International importance ==
The reserve predominantly consists of internationally important lowland heath but also has a wide range of habitats including sand dune, peat bog, alder and willow carr, freshwater lagoons such as the "Little Sea", and 5 km of sandy beach. All six species of native British reptiles are found here including the rare and nationally endangered sand lizard and smooth snake.

The reserve is a notable stronghold of the rare Dartford warbler which successfully survived in this corner of Dorset when nearly wiped out elsewhere in southern England by prolonged periods of extreme winter cold.

== Ancient history ==
The reserve features many prehistoric remains of man's activity in the area pre-dating Roman times, indicated on the OS maps as Tumulus. The reserve also contains the mysterious standing stone known as the Agglestone Rock.

== Fire risk ==
The reserve is notoriously prone to catching fire during hot, dry spells in summer, and large areas have been successively devastated and regenerated in the past. The area was also used in the run-up to D-Day as a training area for the assault troops and as a bombing and strafing range by the Royal Air Force.

== Access ==
The reserve is open to visitors all the year round. By road the reserve can be reached either via the Sandbanks Ferry from Poole and Bournemouth to the north, or via the A351 and B3351 roads from Wareham to the west. There is a mainline rail service by South Western Railway to Wareham station, and during the summer the Swanage Railway steam rail service operates from Wareham to Swanage via Corfe Castle. Local bus services on the Wareham - Swanage - South Haven Point circuit are provided by Wilts & Dorset. There is accommodation and other visitor facilities in Studland village on the edge of the reserve.

== Other nature reserves on the Purbeck Peninsula ==
Natural England has its local base at Slepe Farm near Wareham, and from there also administers the Stoborough Heath NNR and the adjacent Hartland Moor NNR.

The RSPB owns and manages a large nature reserve at Arne and the Dorset Wildlife Trust has two reserves at East Creech and also manages the unique Purbeck Marine Wildlife Reserve at Kimmeridge. The National Trust also owns the great chalk grassland ridge of Ballard Down to the south of Studland, and manages it as a nature reserve.
