= Middle Beach =

Middle Beach may refer to:

- Middle Beach, South Australia, a small town northwest of Adelaide, Australia
- Middle Beach, Dorset, a small beach on Poole Harbour, England, UK

== See also ==
- Mid-Beach, the central section of the city of Miami Beach, Florida
