= Ham Common =

Ham Common may refer to:

- Ham Common, Dorset, England
- Ham Common, London, England
- Ham Common, location of RAAF Base Richmond, City of Hawkesbury, New South Wales, Australia
