= Old Harry Rocks =

Coastal chalk formations in Dorset, England

- Sea stacks
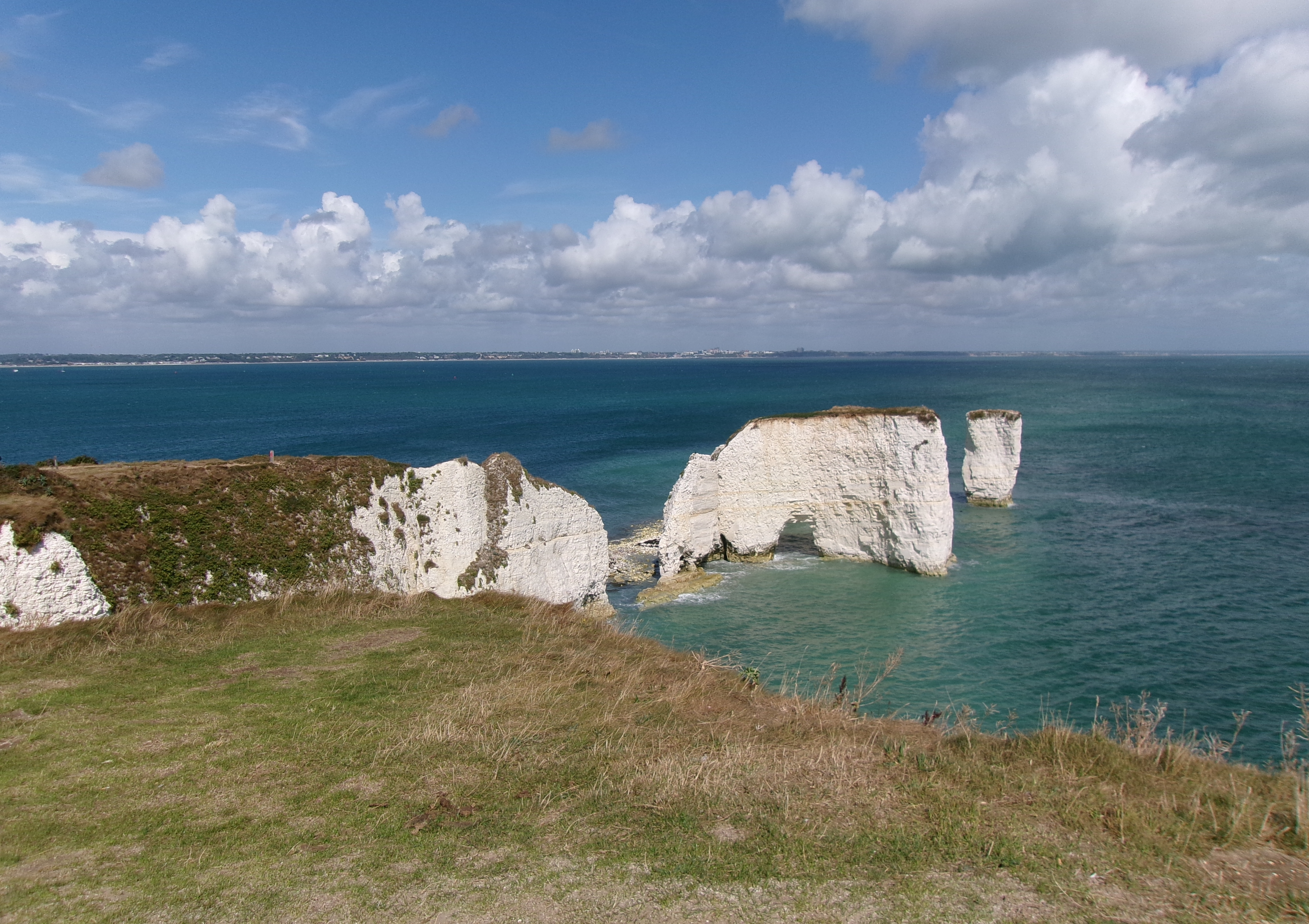

- Location within Dorset
- Coordinates: 50.6423°N 1.9236°W
- Grid position: SZ0350382564
- Location: Isle of Purbeck, Dorset, England
- Part of: Jurassic Coast
- Geology: Chalk

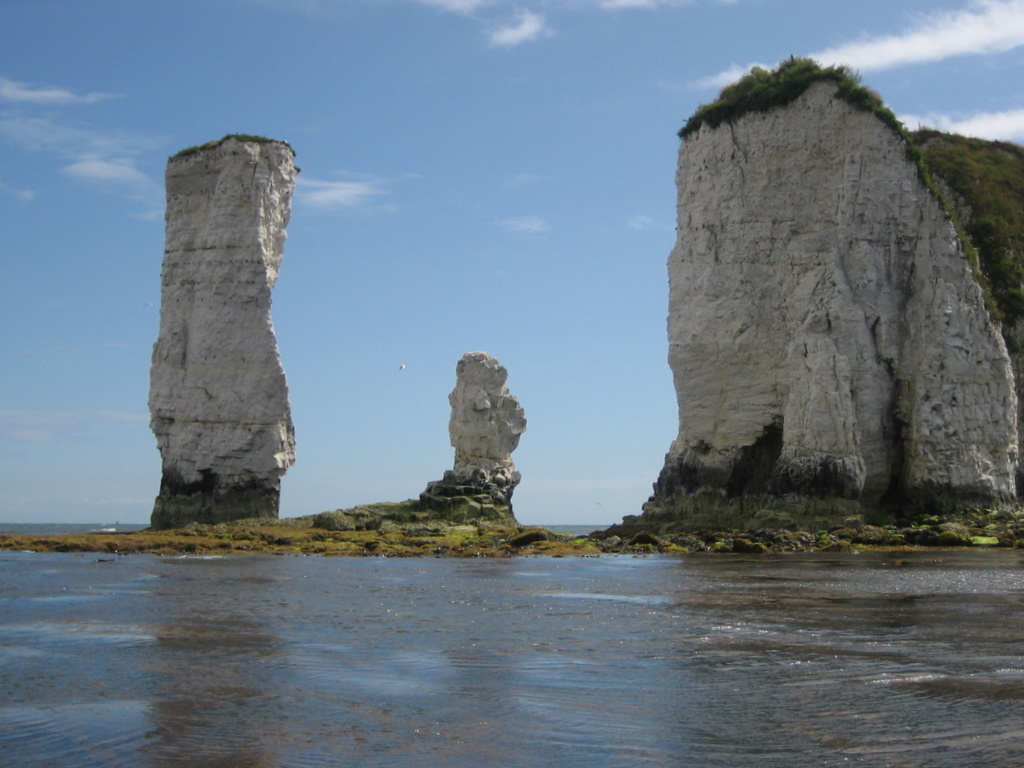
Old Harry and his (latest) wife

Old Harry Rocks are three chalk formations, including a stack and a stump, located at Handfast Point, on the Isle of Purbeck in Dorset, southern England. They mark the most eastern point of the Jurassic Coast, a UNESCO World Heritage Site.

== Location ==
Old Harry Rocks lie directly east of Studland, about 2.5 miles (4 km) north east of Swanage, and about 5 miles (8 km) south of the large towns of Poole and Bournemouth. To the south are the chalk cliffs of Ballard Down, the Pinnacle and Little Pinnacle, much of which is owned by the National Trust. The rocks can be viewed from the Dorset section of the South West Coast Path.

== Formation ==
The chalk of Old Harry Rocks used to be part of a long stretch of chalk between Purbeck and the Isle of Wight, but remained as a headland after large parts of this seam were eroded away. As the headland suffered hydraulic action (a process in which air and water are forced into small cracks by the force of the sea, resulting in enlarging cracks), first caves, then arches formed. The tops of the arches collapsed after being weakened by rainfall and wind, leaving disconnected stacks. One of these stacks is known as Old Harry. Old Harry's Wife was another stack which was eroded through corrosion and abrasion, until the bottom was so weak the top fell away, leaving a stump. Hydraulic action is the main cause of erosion (shear force of the waves) that damaged the rock and caused it to fall away.

== Geology ==
The downlands of Ballard Down are part of the Portsdown chalk formation, containing some bands of flint, and were formed 84–72 million years ago in the Campanian age of the Late Cretaceous. The bands of stone have been gradually eroded over the centuries, some of the earlier stacks having fallen (Old Harry's original wife fell in 1509), while new ones have been formed by the breaching of narrow isthmuses. Across the water to the east, the Needles on the Isle of Wight are usually visible. These are also part of the same chalk band and only a few thousand years ago were connected to Ballard Down.

To form the stacks, the sea gradually eroded along the joints and bedding planes where the softer chalk meets harder bedrock of the rock formations to create a cave. This eventually eroded right through to create an arch. The arch subsequently collapsed to leave the stacks of Old Harry and his wife, No Man's Land (the large outcrop of rock at the end of the cliffs) and the gap of St Lucas' Leap.

Old Harry is formed by erosion processes, which will eventually remove the stack, whilst new stacks develop. Some people desire to preserve the rocks and protect them from the erosive processes that formed Old Harry. The National Trust, who own the stacks in perpetuity, have experience in looking after the coast, and have found that "working with natural processes is the most sustainable approach".

== Legend ==
There are various stories about the naming of the rocks. One legend says that the Devil (traditionally known euphemistically as "Old Harry") slept on the rocks. Another local legend says that the rocks were named after Harry Paye, the infamous Poole pirate, whose ship hid behind the rocks awaiting passing merchantmen. Yet another tale has it that a ninth-century Viking raid was thwarted by a storm and that one of the drowned, Earl Harold, was turned into a pillar of chalk.

== In popular culture ==
The ashes of novelist H G Wells were scattered in the water off Old Harry Rocks.

== Bibliography ==
- The Jurassic Park Trust (2003). A Walk Through Time, the Official Guide to the Jurassic Park. Coastal Publishing. ISBN 978-0-9544845-0-7.
