= Egdon Heath (Holst) =

1927 composition by Gustav Holst

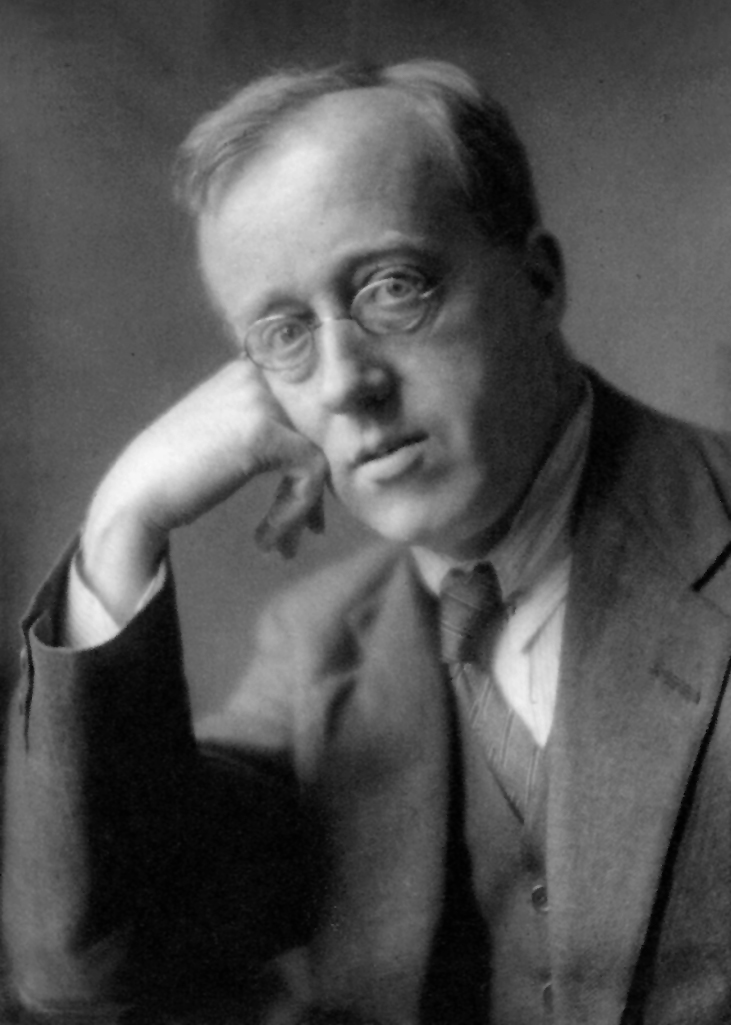
Gustav Holst ca. 1921

Egdon Heath, Op. 47, H. 172, subtitled "A Homage to Thomas Hardy", is a tone poem by Gustav Holst, written in 1927. Holst considered it his most perfectly realised composition.

== Composition ==
Egdon Heath is a fictional place in the equally fictional region of Wessex in the south-west of England, where Thomas Hardy set all his major works. The novel The Return of the Native is entirely set on Egdon Heath, and it is also referred to in The Mayor of Casterbridge and the short story The Withered Arm. During the writing of the tone poem, Holst met and walked with Hardy on a real heath reminiscent of Egdon Heath, between Wool and Bere Regis in Dorset. Hardy accepted Holst's dedication of the piece to him in August 1927.

Holst included a quotation from The Return of the Native at the head of the score. He expressed the desire that the Hardy quote always appear in programme notes.

A place perfectly accordant with man's nature – neither ghastly, hateful, nor ugly; neither common-place, unmeaning, nor tame; but, like man, slighted and enduring; and withal singularly colossal and mysterious in its swarthy monotony!

Holst calls for a normal orchestra but with extra strings and no percussion section. The work typically takes about 13–14 minutes to play. (Note: Timings of recorded versions range from 12m 49s (Sir Adrian Boult/London Philharmonic Orchestra) and David Lloyd-Jones/Royal Scottish National Orchestra) to 16m 27s (Richard Hickox/London Symphony Orchestra). Between these extremes are recordings conducted by Sir Andrew Davis (13m 07s), Bramwell Tovey (14m 14s) and André Previn (14m 35s))

== Performances ==
The work was written for the New York Symphony Orchestra, in response to their commission of a symphony. The NYSO premiered it at the Mecca Temple on 12 February 1928, conducted by Walter Damrosch. Hardy had died three weeks earlier, on 11 January, and in tribute to him, an extract from The Return of the Native was read out by Paul Leyssac at the first performance.

The first British performance took place the next day, 13 February 1928, at Cheltenham, with the City of Birmingham Symphony Orchestra conducted by the composer. The first performance in London, on 23 February 1928, conducted by Václav Talich, was met with a noisy audience; the composer's daughter Imogen described the performance as disastrous. The audience applauded loudly, but according to the anonymous reviewer in The Times, it was from respect for the composer rather than from "that spontaneity which shows that a piece of music has come home to the hearers". The Manchester Guardian's critic agreed that the reception was "respectful rather than enthusiastic", but declared that nevertheless, "there is not the smallest doubt that Egdon Heath will long outwear The Planets."

Holst considered the work his most perfectly realised composition, an opinion shared by Ralph Vaughan Williams and others. But it has never had the profile of works such as The Planets and St Paul's Suite. In 1934 Edwin Evans speculated on why the public had not yet shared the composer's assessment:

Its chromaticism verges on the atonal – there are many passages to which it is difficult to assign a definite tonality. Yet the effect is not vague in the musical sense. It is the emotion that sets the ear guessing. It is one more frequently expressed by painters. One is reminded of those landscapes which at the first glance present a flat, monochrome surface and come to life gradually as the eye probes into them.

== Recordings ==
Orchestra	Conductor	Year	Venue
London Philharmonic Orchestra	Sir Adrian Boult	1961	Kingsway Hall
London Symphony Orchestra	Benjamin Britten	1961	St Bartholomew's Church, Orford
London Symphony Orchestra	André Previn	1974	Abbey Road, Studio 1
BBC Symphony Orchestra	Andrew Davis	1994	St Augustine's, Kilburn
London Symphony Orchestra	Richard Hickox	1994	All Saints', Tooting
Winnipeg Symphony Orchestra	Bramwell Tovey	1995	Centennial Concert Hall, Winnipeg
Royal Scottish National Orchestra	David Lloyd-Jones	1998	Henry Wood Hall, Glasgow

Source: WorldCat.

== In popular culture ==
The Royal Scottish National Orchestra recording is used in the soundtrack for the video game Civilization V, as one of the pieces that can play in the background when playing as a European nation.

== Notes, references and sources ==
=== Sources ===
- Foreman, Lewis (1996). Notes to Chandos CD CHAN9420. Colchester: Chandos. OCLC 815453876.
- Holst, Imogen (1969). Gustav Holst (second ed.). London and New York: Oxford University Press. ISBN 978-0-19-315417-9.
- Taylor, Kevin (28 November 2013). Hans Urs von Balthasar and the Question of Tragedy in the Novels of Thomas Hardy. London and New York: Bloomsbury; T & T Clark. ISBN 978-0-567-21625-0.
