= The National Trust (TV series) =

British television documentary series

The National Trust is a ten-part BBC television documentary examining various aspects of National Trust, first aired in 2005.

Among the National Trust properties presented were Studland Beach & Nature Reserve, where local residents experience severe problems with the Trust, 251 Menlove Avenue, John Lennon's boyhood home, Tyntesfield, Waddesdon Manor, and Stonehenge.
