= Hamworthy Beach =

Public beach in Dorset, England

Coordinates: 50.7138°N 2.0249°W

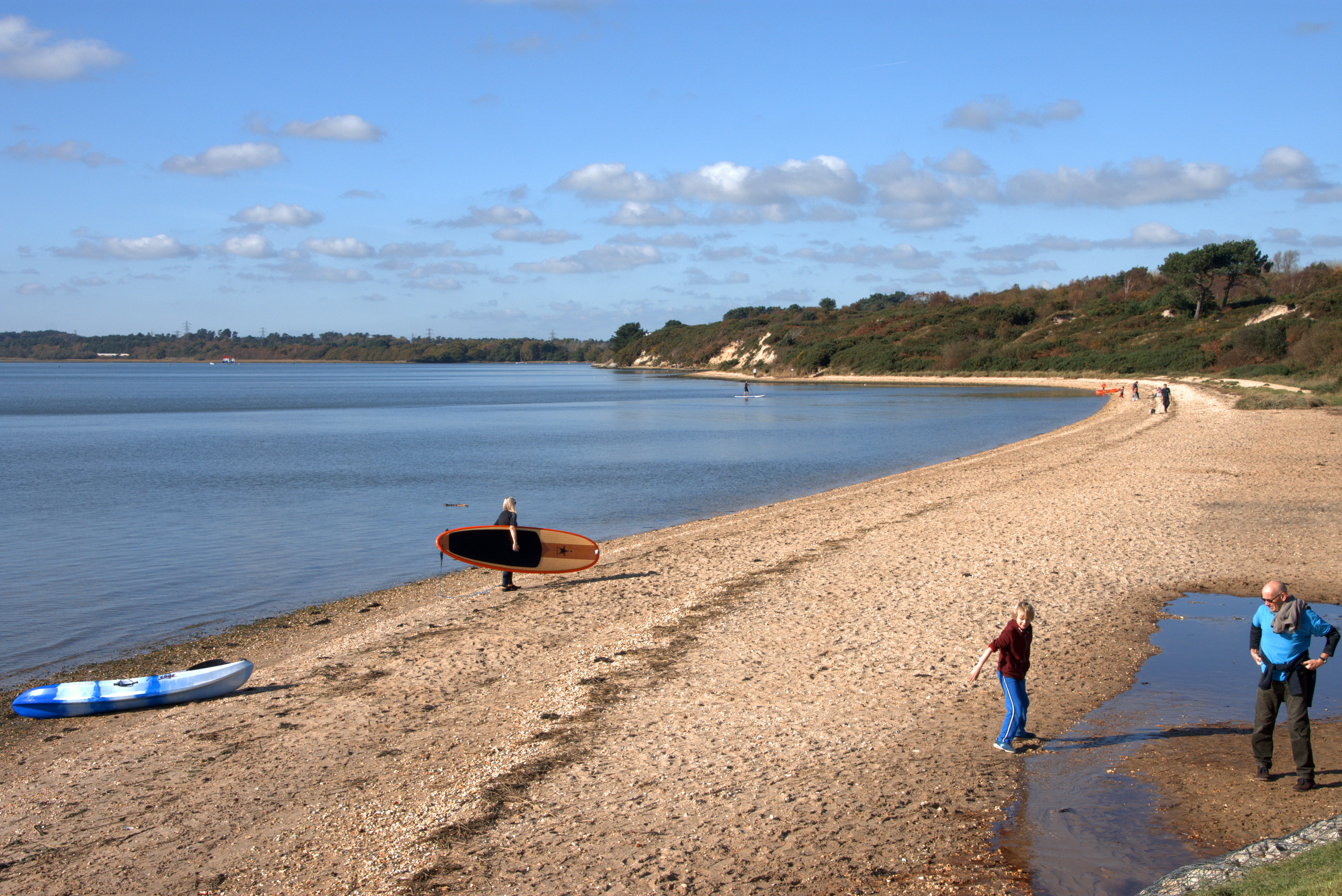
Hamworthy beach, Dorset

Hamworthy Beach is situated between the Marine Camp and Rockley Sands in Poole Bay, Dorset, known to locals but more difficult to find for outsiders. The local community refer to it as "Up Lake". It is a muddy beach with sand and shingle. It has its own jetty, known as Lake Pier, which is quite popular with local fishermen. Evenings promising good sunsets attract a number of photographers to this beauty spot. From the beach can be seen Arne Nature Reserve, Brownsea Island and the Purbeck Hills. Behind the beach is Ham Common.

With a car park close to the water side, this is a popular venue for launching kayaks. A toilet block is present.
