= Studland =

Village in Dorset, England

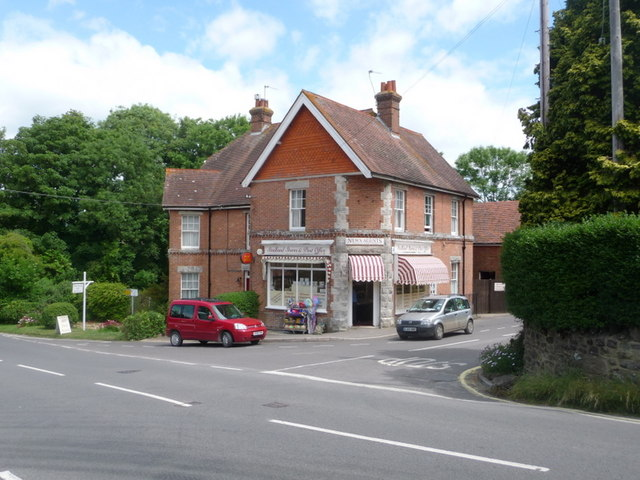
- Studland village centre

- Location within Dorset
- Population: 425 (2011)
- OS grid reference: SZ036825
- Civil parish: Studland
- Unitary authority: Dorset
- Ceremonial county: Dorset
- Region: South West
- Country: England
- Sovereign state: United Kingdom
- Post town: SWANAGE
- Postcode district: BH19
- Dialling code: 01929
- Police: Dorset
- Fire: Dorset and Wiltshire
- Ambulance: South Western
- UK Parliament: South Dorset

Studland is a village and civil parish on the Isle of Purbeck in Dorset, England. The village is located about 2 miles (3.2 km) north of the town of Swanage, over a steep chalk ridge, and 3 miles (4.8 km) south of the South East Dorset conurbation at Sandbanks, from which it is separated by Poole Harbour. The parish includes Brownsea Island within the harbour. In the 2011 census the parish had 182 households and a population of 425, though many of the houses in the village are holiday homes, second homes, or guest houses, and the village's population varies depending upon the season.

Studland is famous for its beaches and nature reserve.

== Description ==
Studland is sited in the lee of Ballard Down, close to the east-facing Studland Bay, a 2.5 miles (4.0 km) long curved sweep of sandy beaches backed by dunes and heathland. The beaches are named South Beach, Middle Beach and Knoll Beach, with another at Shell Bay to the north.

Although a coastal village, the houses in Studland are mostly sited a few hundred metres inland. At the start of the twentieth century Sir Frederick Treves described the village as "a medley of country lanes, lost among trees, with a few thatch-roofed cottages dotted about in a wild garden of brambles, ferns, and gorse". He noted that Studland had "no pretence to a quay", but rather "turns its face from the sea to bury it among its myrtles and fuchsia bushes". He lamented the arrival of tourists and the construction of villas in the village however, commenting that "The red brick epidemic ... has seized upon it mercilessly."

Since Treves' time the village has expanded with more buildings filling in gaps along its streets, much of the construction taking place in the early and mid 20th century, plus some more recently. Few ancient buildings remain in the village today, with the notable exception of the parish church, which is largely unaltered from Norman times, construction dating probably from around 1180. Close to the church is a modern Celtic cross, which was erected in 1976 and uses the old Saxon cross foundation as its base.

== Geography ==
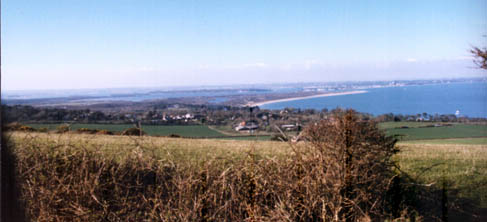
Studland Bay, Godlingstone Heath, Poole Harbour and Bournemouth from Ballard Down

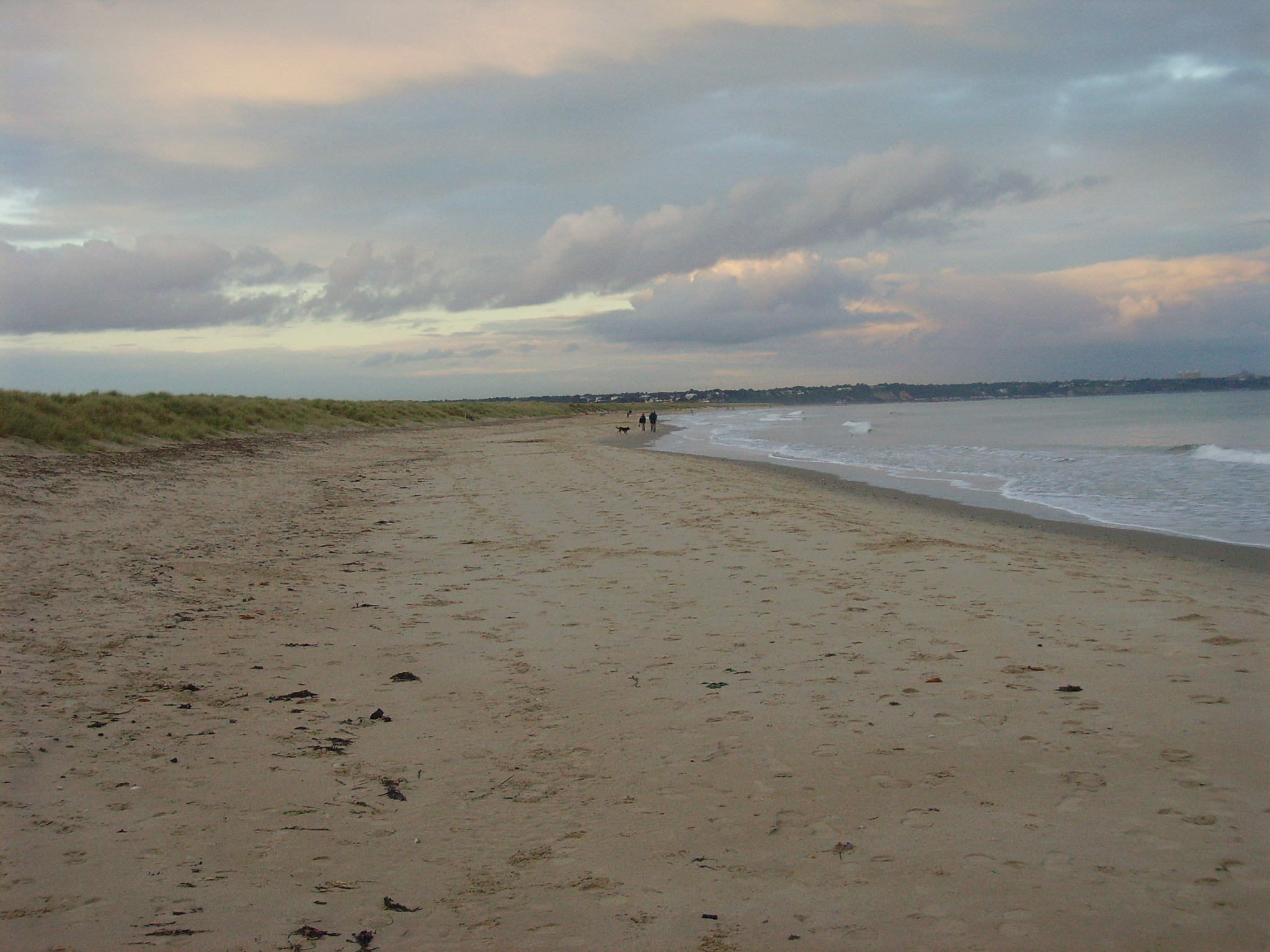
The beach at Studland

=== Studland Bay and beach management ===
Studland Bay is protected from the prevailing southwesterly winds and storms by Ballard Down and Handfast Point, the chalk headland that separates Studland from Swanage Bay to the south. In the 17th century there began a process of sand accumulation in the bay and along the South Haven Peninsula stretching north, resulting in natural land reclamation and the creation or expansion of the bay's beaches and its psammosere (sand dune system).

The beaches at Studland Bay are amongst the most popular in the country, and on hot summer weekends they fill up with thousands of people. The South East Dorset Conurbation lies on the other side of Poole Harbour, resulting in the beaches being relatively accessible to a large population. North of the visitor centre the beach and dunes are owned and managed by the National Trust, who have restricted parking provision at the site to prevent overcrowding. A short northern stretch of beach is reserved as a naturist beach. (Note: Naturist section of beach located at 50°39′56″N 1°56′48″W)

Since the early 20th century the supply of sand to the bay has depleted and erosion is occurring so that, if natural processes are uninterrupted, the coastline may in time retreat to its previous line, visible as a line of higher ground between Redend Point and the hill east of the Knoll House Hotel. In January 2004 the BBC television series The National Trust investigated the conflicts between different groups of people who use the beach and heath at Studland. The series particularly covered the debate about coastal management, with the Trust proposing to remove defensive walls to allow natural processes to shape the coastline, though this would result in loss of some land and property.

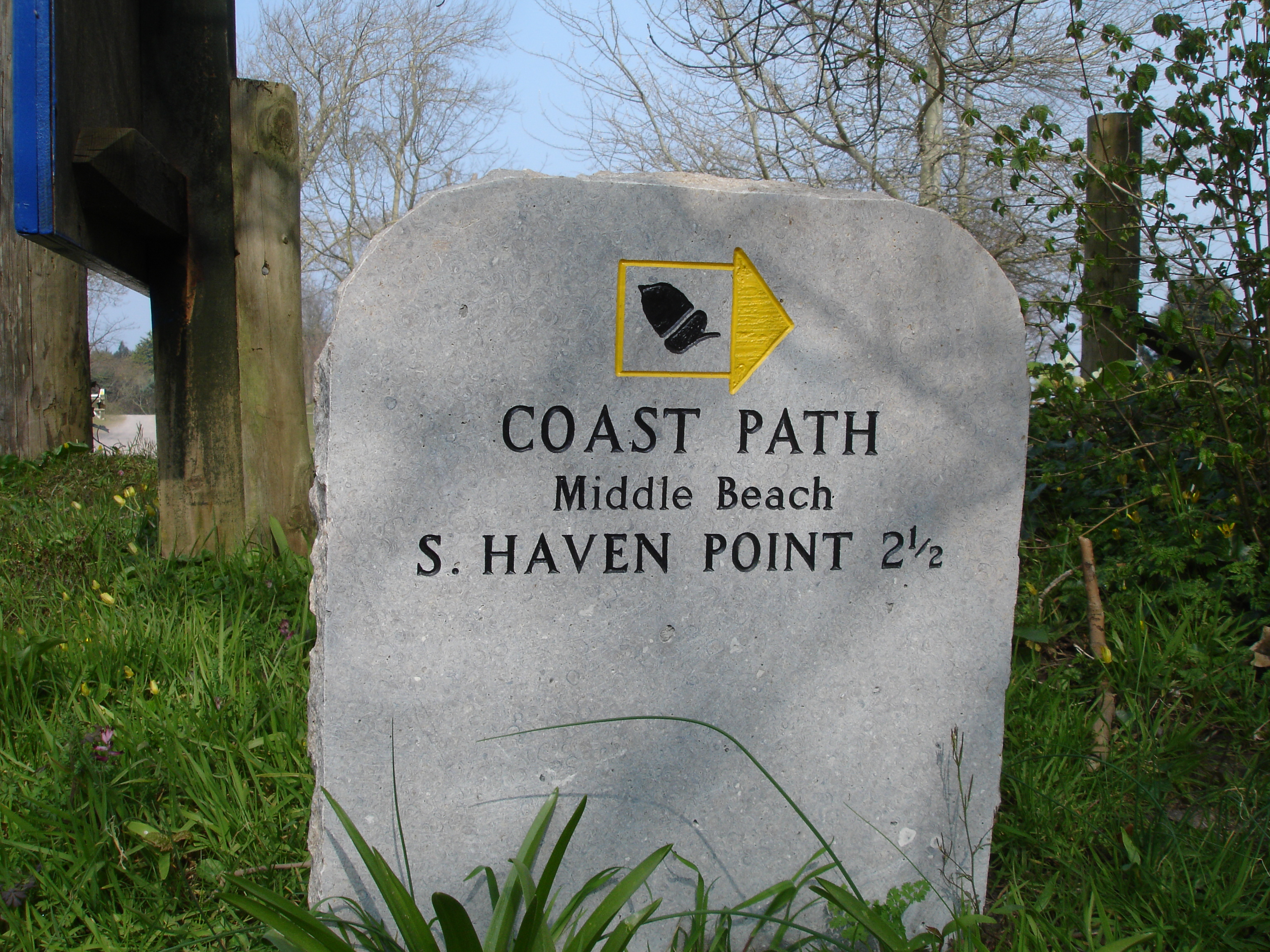
South West Coast Path stone sign near Studland

The final stage of the South West Coast Path (if walked in the conventional anti-clockwise direction, starting at Minehead, Somerset) follows Studland Bay and ends at South Haven Point, where a sculpture marks the end.

=== Heathland and nature reserve ===
Behind the sand dunes there is a large area of heathland, named Studland Heath to the north of the village and Godlingston Heath to the west. This area is also owned and managed by the National Trust. Within Studland Heath is an acidic freshwater lake called Little Sea, which was cut off from the sea by the development of the dunes, and is a haven for birds and other wildlife. Studland and Godlingston Heath NNR has been a national nature reserve since 1946, and the site is on English Nature's list of "Spotlight Reserves", the 31 most important reserves in England. The site is also a protected Site of Special Scientific Interest, and is within the Dorset National Landscape area, part of the Purbeck Heritage Coast, and a gateway to the Jurassic Coast World Heritage Site.

Standing on a mound on Godlingston Heath is the 17 feet (5.2 m) high Agglestone Rock, estimated to weigh 400 tonnes (440 tons). The rock is also known as the Devil's Anvil, and local myth states that the devil threw it there from The Needles on the Isle of Wight, reputedly aiming for Corfe Castle, Bindon Abbey, Stonehenge or Salisbury Cathedral. In truth, it is more than likely part of a band of rocks that ran across the whole of Godlingston Heath. The sandy earth was eroded around the firmer rock and left it standing proud. "Aggle" was taken into the old Dorset dialect as meaning "to wobble". In September 1970 the rock fell to one side, resulting in it losing its distinctive inverted-cone 'anvil' appearance. Other lumps in the landscape can be seen across the heath, including the Puckstone which, in years to come, may be another standing rock similar to the Agglestone.

=== Oilfield ===
The heath and harbour are home to Britain's largest onshore oil field, and Perenco's Wytch Farm gathering station is hidden amongst a pine forest to the west of the heath.

== History ==
The existence of salt pans and salt workers at Studland is recorded in the Domesday Book of 1086. St Nicholas' Church, dedicated to the patron saint of sailors, is built on the site of an earlier Saxon building which was destroyed by the Danes in the 9th century, and had itself been constructed on an earlier, possibly pre-Christian foundation. Records from 1340 show that fishing was an important industry in Studland in the 14th century. In 1381 records show a castle existed on the cliffs at Handfast Point to the east of the village. By the 16th century this had been replaced with another castle, which existed until at least the 18th century when a blockhouse was added to it. Today nothing remains as the buildings were lost into the sea as a result of coastal erosion of the cliffs. The Royal National Institution for the Preservation of Life from Shipwreck stationed a lifeboat at Studland in 1826, but it was withdrawn in 1848.

=== World War II ===
In 1940, the coastline at Studland Bay was one of the two stretches of Dorset coast where a German invasion was considered most likely and it was fortified as a part of British anti-invasion preparations of World War II. In 1942 the hamlet of Goathorn was evacuated and the area taken over by the military. The hamlet was subsequently lost to heathland but the pier, which once boasted a tramway, remains.

The village and beach were used as a training area before the D-Day landing in the Second World War. On top of Redend Point, a small sandstone cliff which splits the beach in two at high tide, is Fort Henry. Built in 1943 by Canadian engineers, it is 90 feet (27 m) long, with 3-foot-thick (0.9 m) walls and an 80-foot-wide (24 m) recessed observation slit. Seven Valentine tanks fitted with duplex drive equipment sank in the bay during Exercise Smash in April 1944, resulting in the death of six soldiers. On 18 April 1944, King George VI, General Sir Bernard Montgomery and General Dwight D. Eisenhower, met here (at the Knoll House Hotel) to observe the training troops and discuss the plans for the coming battle.

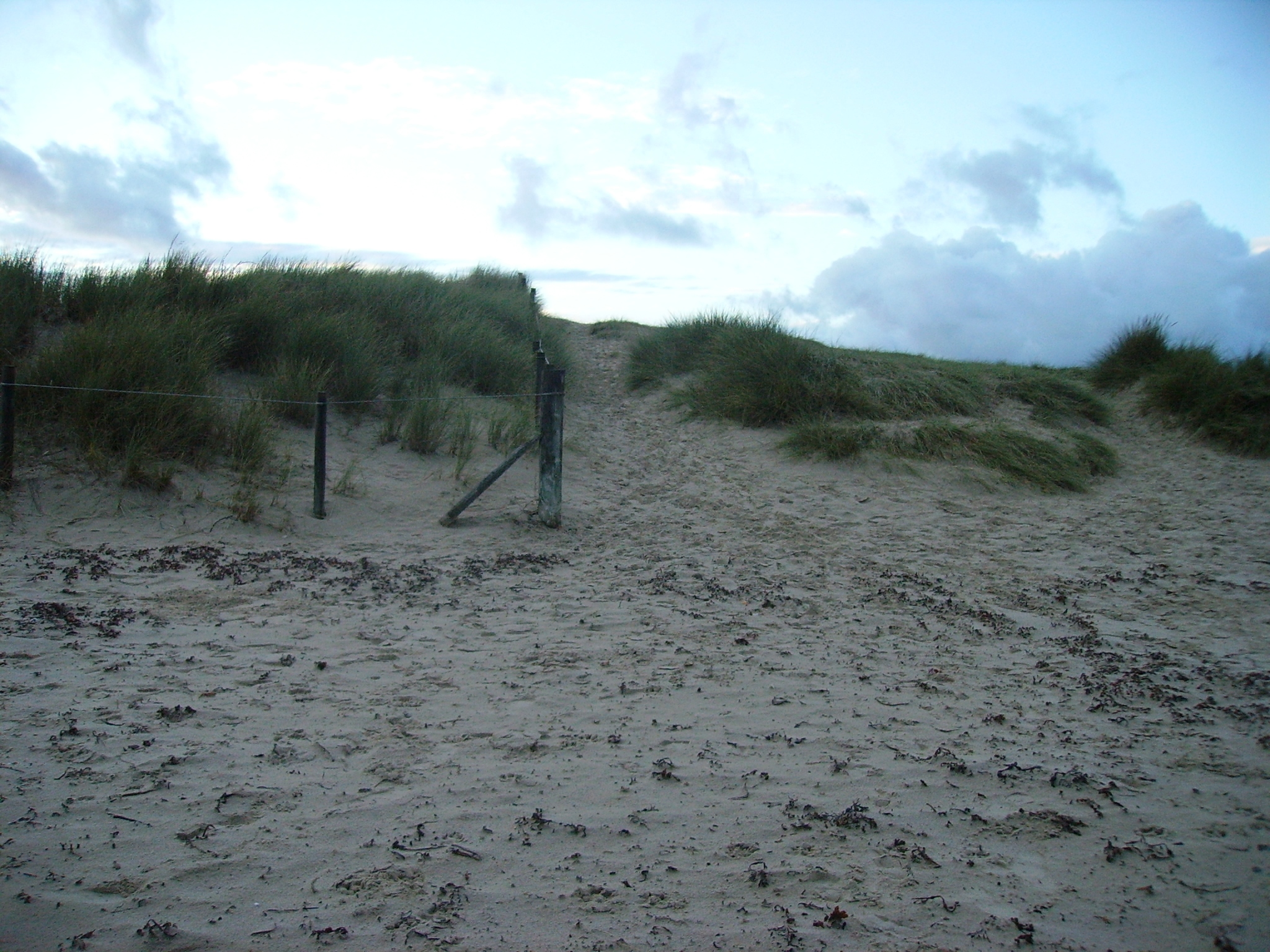
An example of fencing at Studland and its success

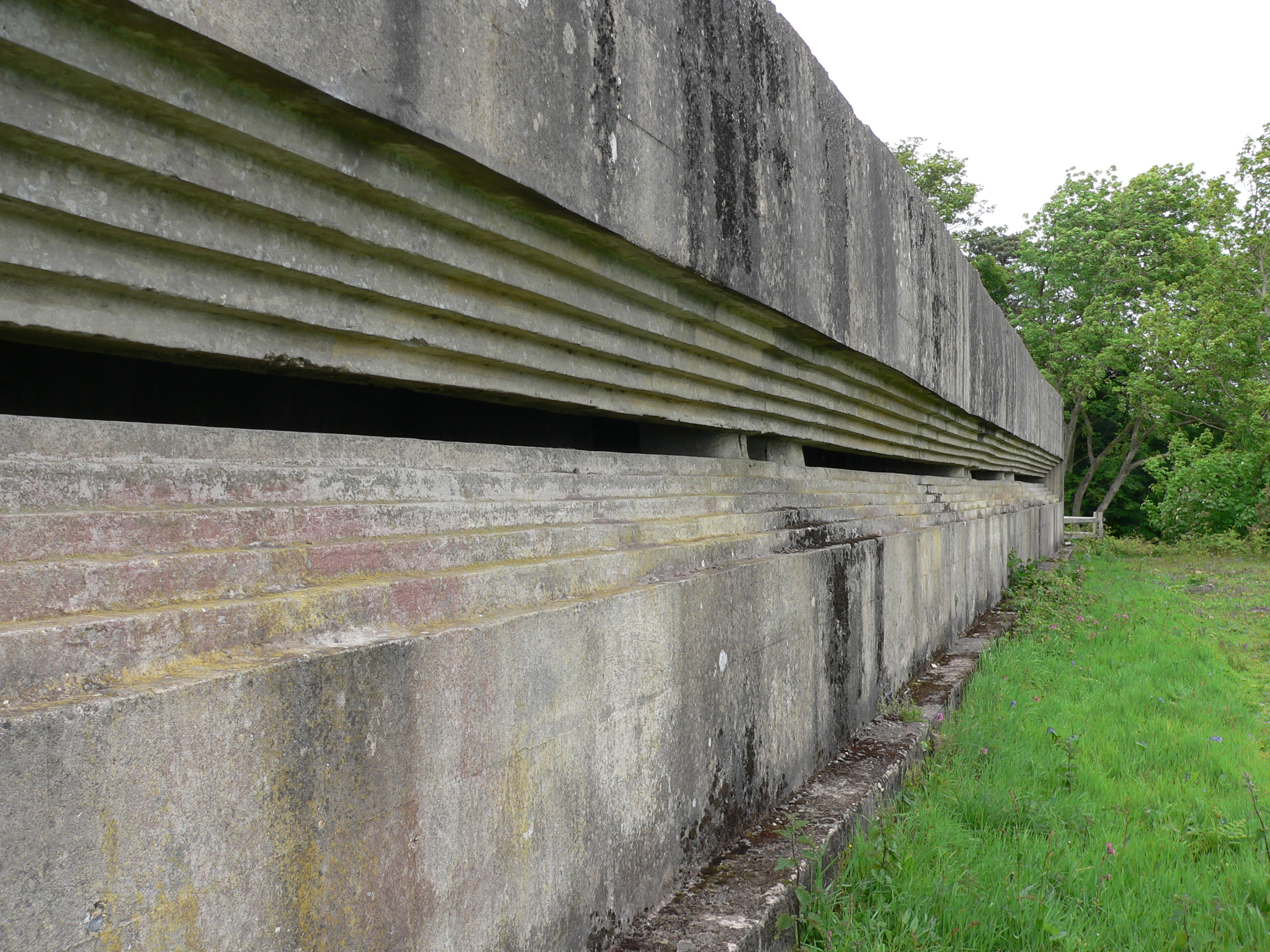
Fort Henry Bunker, Studland

== Ecology ==
The Studland and Godlingston Heath National Nature Reserve has a variety of habitats including heathland, bogs, woodland, alder and willow carr, sand dunes, scrub and freshwater, which support a variety of wildlife including large populations of wildfowl and insects. Studland Bay is particularly good for sighting rarer grebes and divers in winter, with up to 20 black-necked grebe and 5 great northern diver recorded. The Studland Peninsula is one of the best places to see Dartford warbler in the UK with around 130 pairs nesting on the heath; this is about 7% of the UK population. The nature reserve is one of only a few places (mostly in Dorset) in Britain which is home to all six native reptile species.

Two species of seahorse (the spiny seahorse, Hippocampus guttulatus and the short-snouted seahorse, Hippocampus hippocampus) have been discovered in Studland Bay, specifically a seagrass meadow at the southern end of the beach. Anecdotal evidence from residents reported in the Studland Parish Magazine indicates that both types of seahorse have been found in the bay since at least the 1970s, possibly encouraged by the reputed growth in the seagrass beds.

Embryo sand dunes are bound together by colonies of salt-resistant couch grass (Elymus repens) and lyme-grass (Leymus arenarius), which permit the gradual expansion of the dune until long-rooted marram grass (Ammophila (Poaceae)) can establish itself once the sand reaches approximately a metre in height. Moving away from the shoreline, beyond the embryo dunes are found a ridge of "mobile dunes" which may have been in situ for over 50 years; "semi-fixed" dunes bound with grasses, mosses and wild flowers; and "fixed dunes" capable of supporting bracken and saplings.

Nutrient-poor acidic bogs occur within the vicinity of the Agglestone in particular, a result of a lack of carbonate in the rock strata and pockets of clay trapping surface water. These bogs support specialised plant species such as insectivorous sundews.

== Politics ==
Studland is covered by the South Dorset constituency.

After 2019 structural changes to local government in England, Studland is part of the South East Purbeck ward which elects 1 member to Dorset Council.

== Studland in popular culture ==
- Egdon Heath, which figures prominently in Thomas Hardy's celebrated novel The Return of the Native, is a fictionalised version of the Poole basin heaths, most prominently the current Black Heath, Duddle Heath and Puddletown Heath around his birthplace, but including elements from Studland and Godlingston heaths.
- Mr Plod the Toyland policeman in Enid Blyton's Noddy stories is reportedly based on PC Christopher Rhone, a Studland police constable.
- The beach, with Bournemouth in the background, was the setting of the opening scene from the first episode of Monty Python's Flying Circus with Michael Palin staggering out of the shallow sea and collapsing on the beach before saying "It's..."
- The video for the Coldplay single "Yellow" was filmed on the beach.
- The beach scene set in Spain in the Only Fools and Horses episode "It Never Rains..." was filmed on Studland beach.

== Notable residents ==
- Charles Edmund Nugent, Admiral of the Fleet
- Eyre Crowe, British diplomat
- Herbert Cook, Baronet
- Reginald Hoare, British diplomat
- Stephen Warner, evangelist

== See also ==
- List of Dorset beaches
