= Egdon Heath =

Fictional area in Thomas Hardy's work

Egdon Heath is a fictitious area of Thomas Hardy's Wessex inhabited sparsely by the people who cut the furze (gorse) that grows there. The entire action of Hardy's novel The Return of the Native takes place on Egdon Heath, and it also features in The Mayor of Casterbridge and the short story "The Withered Arm" (1888). The area is rife with witchcraft and superstition.

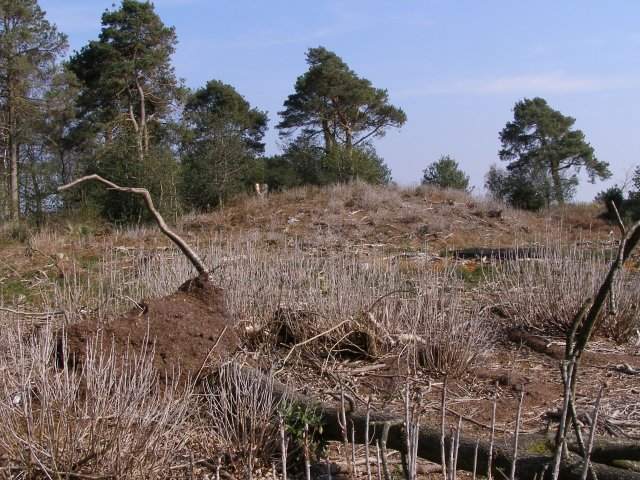
One of the Rainbarrows, Duddle Heath, part of Hardy's Egdon Heath

== Real-world origins ==
Hardy located the Dorsetshire heath in his maps, the end-papers for editions of his work published in his lifetime, and in The Return of the Native, as an amalgam of scattered areas of moorland chiefly east of Dorchester and north-west of Wareham, north of the Dorchester-Wareham road and south of the Dorchester-Wimborne road. The valley of the River Frome, scene of much of Tess of the d'Urbervilles, marks the southern boundary of the heath. In Thomas Hardy: A Biography (1982), Hardy expert Michael Millgate suggests the small area of heath beside Hardy's birthplace at Upper Bockhampton as the origin of Egdon Heath, but Hardy added to it areas near Puddletown, Bovington, and Winfrith. The small heath by Hardy's childhood home is much smaller than its fictional counterpart. The ancient round barrows named Rainbarrows, and Rushy Pond, which lie immediately behind Hardy's childhood home, form the centre of the fictional heath.

In modern times much that was uninhabited in Hardy's days is now either populated or planted with forest. The former nuclear station at Winfrith Heath also erased much of Hardy's landscape, though efforts are being made to reclaim it. Studland Heath, to the south-east, was not part of Hardy's Egdon, though its landscape remains similar to it and has been less damaged.

== Egdon Heath in Hardy's writing ==
In The Return of the Native Egdon Heath forms a symbol for the cosmic world of mankind, and is, like man, "slighted and enduring." In the preface to the novel, Hardy describes what the location means to him: "It is pleasant to dream that some spot in the extensive tract whose south-western quarter is here described may be the heath of that traditionary King of Wessex – Lear." Millgate suggests the moors of Wuthering Heights as a close analogy (Thomas Hardy: His Career as a Novelist, 1971, p. 131), although Hardy's symbolic use of the landscape is more insistent, and underpinned by appeals to classical mythology (e.g. the Prometheus or Icarus myths) and consciously Latinized vocabulary.

Hence Egdon Heath is another example of Hardy's landscape reflecting the permanent human condition. In the novel, he says:

"The untameable, Ishmaelitish thing that Egdon now was it had always been. Civilization was its enemy: and ever since the beginning of vegetation its soil had worn the same antique brown dress, the natural and invariable garment of the particular formation. . . . The great inviolate place had an ancient permanence which the sea cannot claim."

— Book First, chapter 1

To those characters like Clym Yeobright who understand the heath, and by implication man's essentially subordinate place in nature, Egdon is home, a place to be loved. For those in Promethean revolt, like Eustacia Vye, it is a prison offering only the illusion of escape.

Hardy's relationship with the landscape has been examined at length by critics, and Egdon Heath is one of the most frequently cited and best known.

== References in other works ==
- In 1927 the composer Gustav Holst wrote a tone poem for orchestra entitled Egdon Heath: A Homage to Thomas Hardy, regarded by the composer as his finest work. He considered the restrained but brooding piece to be his most perfectly realised work. In the early 1970s, Granada Television produced a half-hour documentary in its 'Parade' art series entitled Egdon Heath in which an actor portraying Holst is walking across the barren heath while the music in playing, and sees scenes and characters from The Return of the Native.
- In 1954 Bill Russo composed a Third Stream work titled Egdon Heath. This was also in homage to Hardy, written for the Stan Kenton Orchestra.
- In Evelyn Waugh's Decline and Fall, "Egdon Heath" is the location of a prison.
- Hardy also referenced Egdon Heath in his poem "The Moth Signal"; it is where the action unfolds.
