= Shell Bay =

Bay in Dorset England

Coordinates: 50.6766°N 1.9452°W

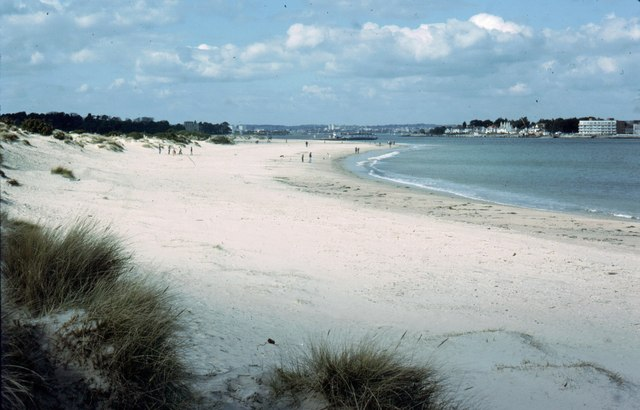
Shell Bay

Shell Bay is a small bay in Dorset, England on the Studland peninsula. It is on the south side of the mouth of Poole Harbour and connected with Sandbanks by the Sandbanks Ferry which runs regularly across the entrance to the harbour and carries vehicles, foot passengers and cyclists. Bus number 50 (Bournemouth to Swanage) also stops at Shell Bay. The beach is an unspoilt sandy beach, backed by dunes and heathland. A couple of streams flow over the beach from the heathland inland of the beach. The beach offers wonderful views over the bay to nearby Bournemouth and is also a good view point for watching the ships passing in and out of Poole Harbour, including the Condor Ferries to the Channel Islands.
