= Middle Beach, Dorset =

Beach in Dorset, England

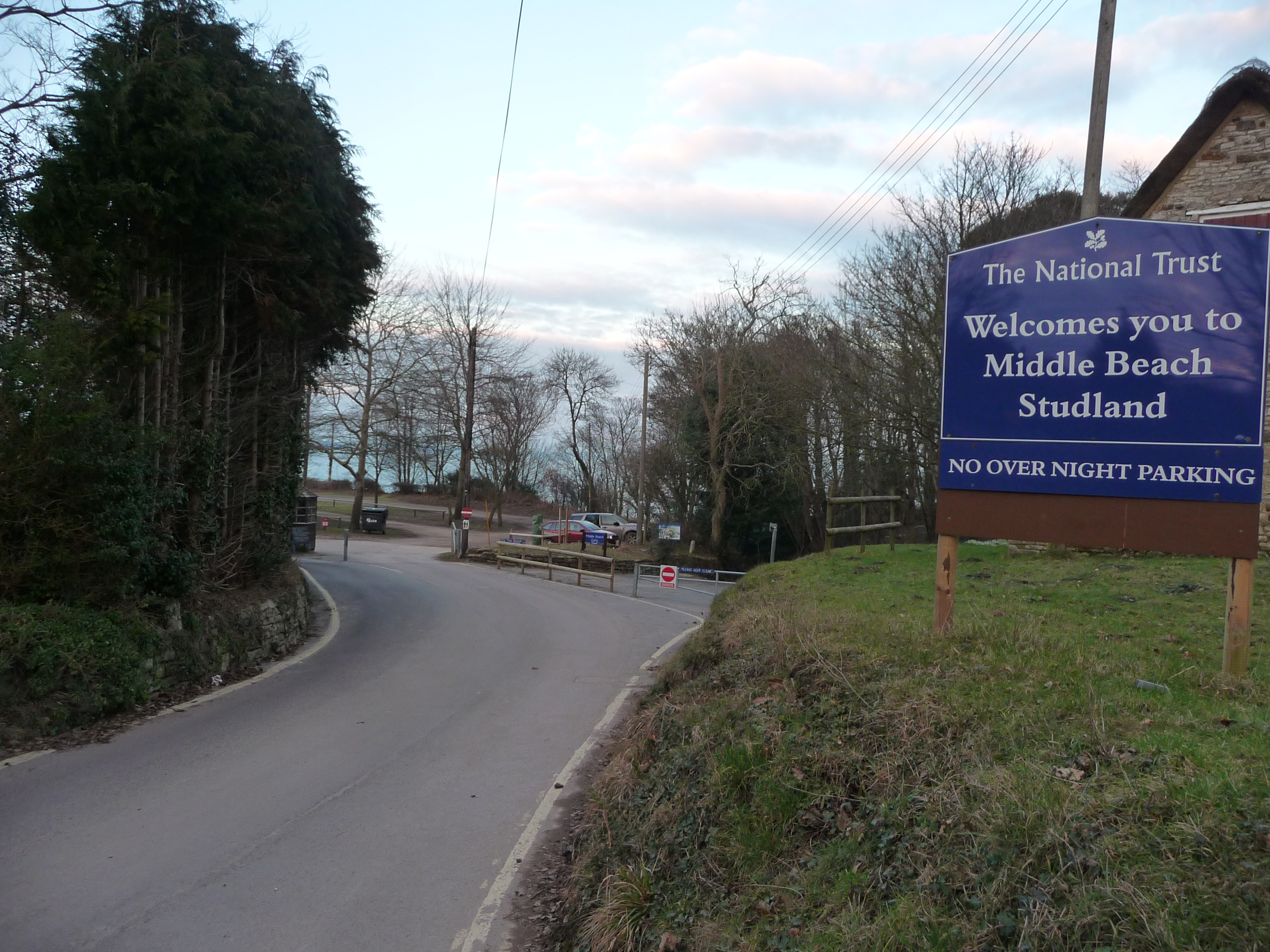
Entrance to Middle Beach.

Middle Beach is a small beach on the Isle of Purbeck in Dorset, England. The beach is located north of Studland and is owned by the National Trust.

== Beach ==
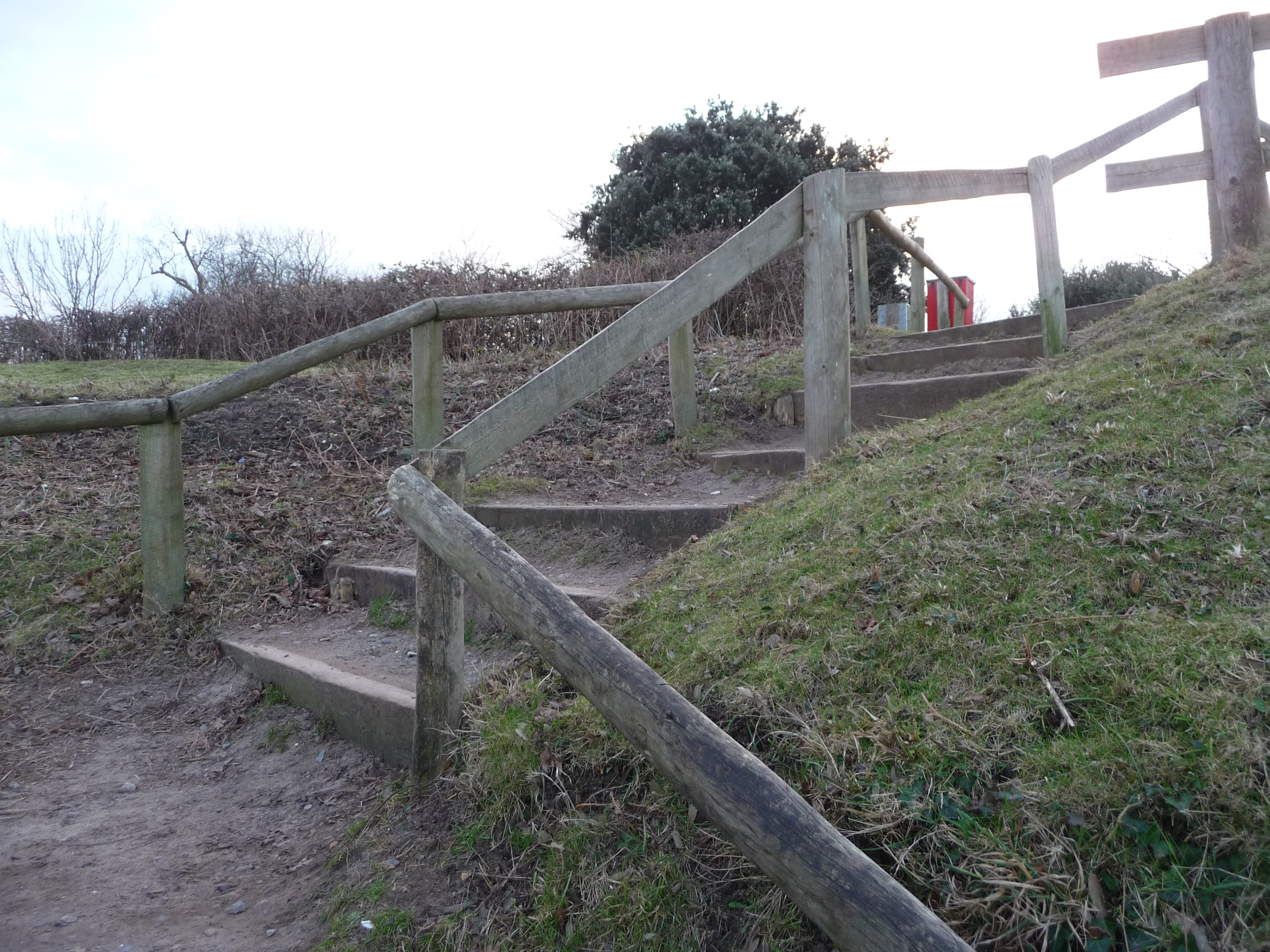
The steps to Middle Beach.

The beach has views of Poole from across Studland Bay and Poole Harbour.

== Café ==
A café has stood in the same spot since 1904 and the current building opened in 1953. In 2016, when the National Trust announced that they would be moving the café and public toilets to higher ground due to "coastal erosion and subsidence", 3,000 people signed a petition opposing the move. Plans to demolish the café were later rejected by a vote of National Trust members at their annual general meeting. In November 2022 the café was condemned to be demolished after the lease on the property ran out. The café closed for the final time on 2 January 2023. After its demolition the National Trust was accused of turning the beach in the heart of an Area of Outstanding Natural Beauty into a "bomb site" and an "eyesore". In 2024, the planned removal of the pumping station, retaining wall and sea defences will take place.

== Sea defences ==
In June 2025, the National Trust approved a plan to remove the beach's sea defences. This is part of a plan to create a more natural beach. The work began in September 2025. The large stone blocks at the shoreline date from the Second World War will be kept in place due to their historical significance..

== Unexploded devices ==
On 31 December 2021, police closed the car park after a World War I grenade was uncovered. On 4 August 2022, an unexploded World War II shell was found on Middle Beach and was detonated by Royal Navy's bomb disposal team.
