= Ballard Cliff =

Coordinates: 50.6305°N 1.9387°W

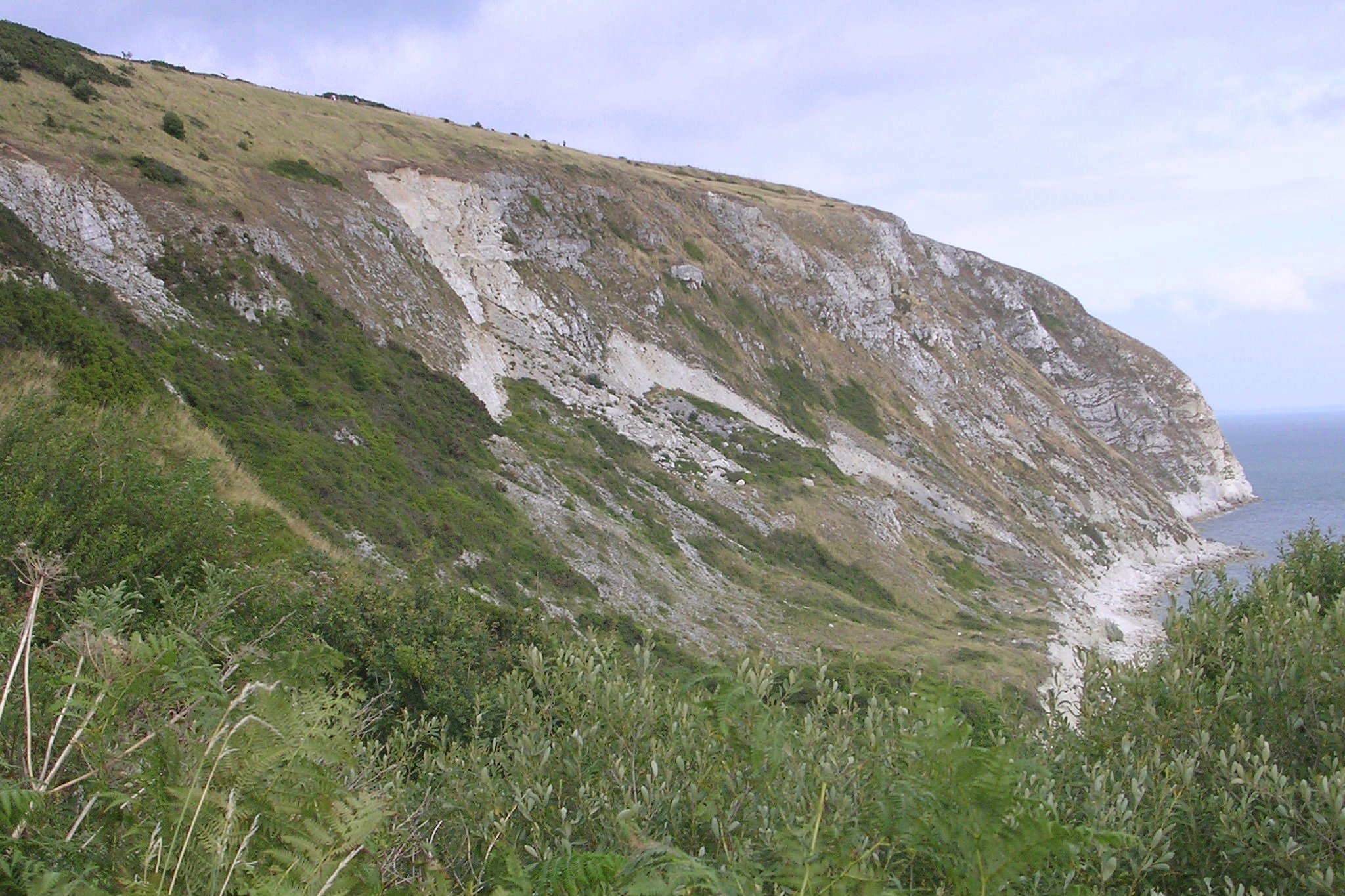
Ballard Cliff from the South West Coast Path to the west

Ballard Cliff is part of the Jurassic Coast near Swanage in the Isle of Purbeck in Dorset, England. The steeply dipping Cretaceous chalk that marks the northern end of Swanage Bay takes over from the Wealden beds at this location. A series of landslides during the late 1990s and early 2000s created a prominent white 'zig-zag' in the scarp. A rotational slip in the Chalk, Upper Greensand and Gault has developed, exposing a section of the soft, blue-grey Gault clay at the base of the cliff.

== See also ==
- Geology of Dorset
- Jurassic Coast
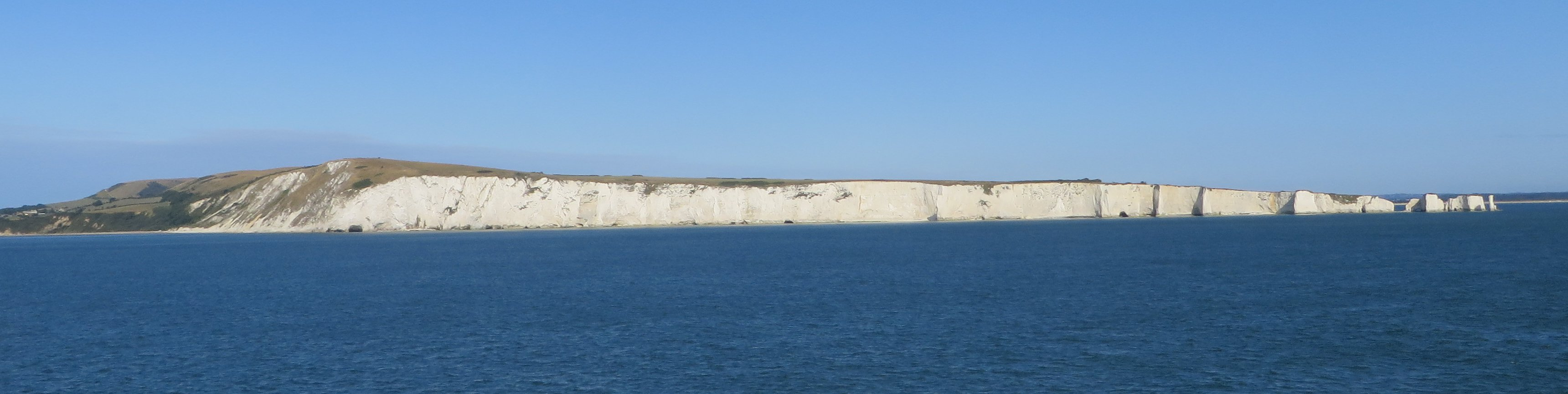
Ballard Cliff
