= Ballard Down =

Area of chalk downland on the Purbeck Hills, Dorset, England

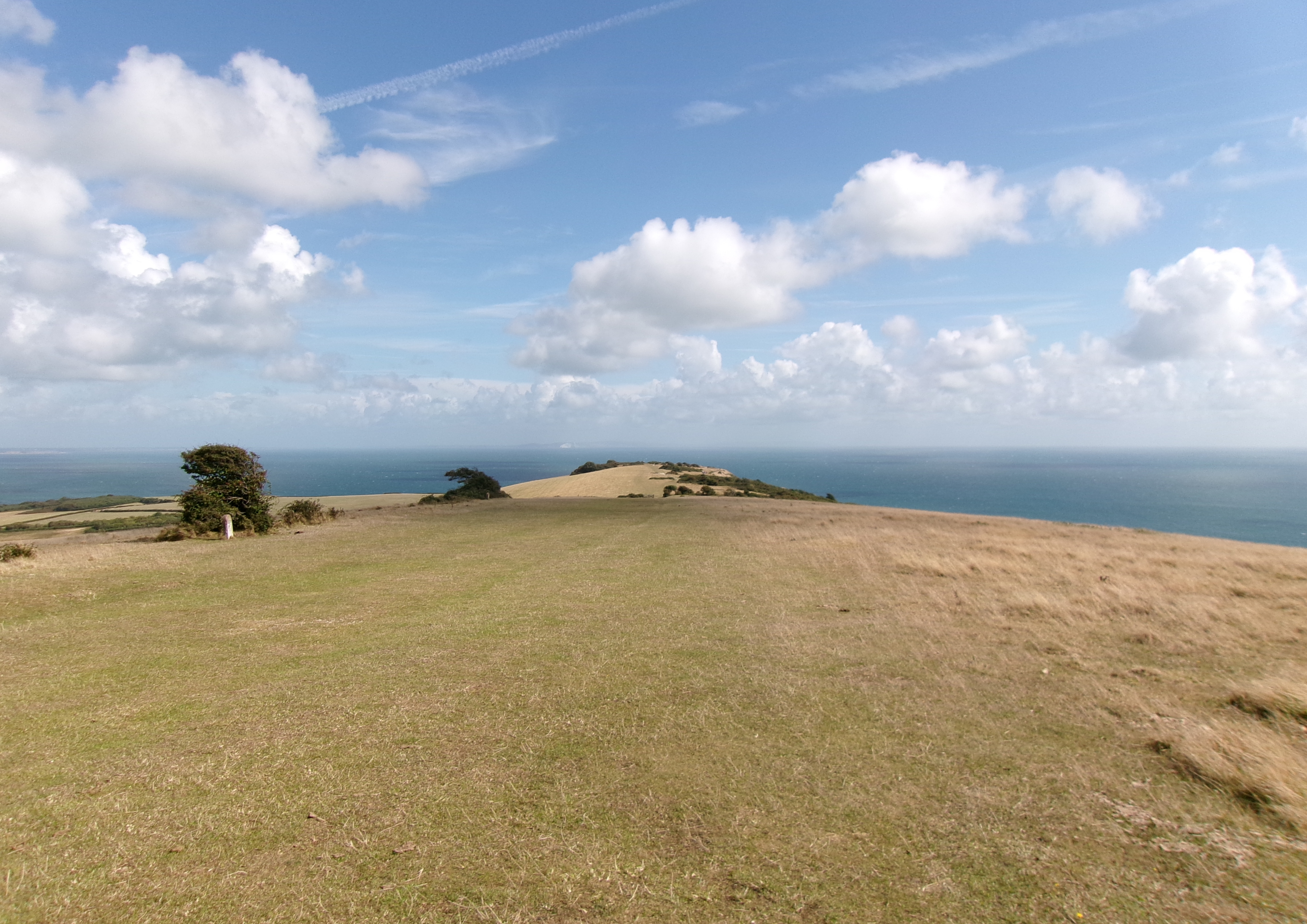
- View east along Ballard Down

Highest point
- Elevation: 162 m (531 ft)
- Prominence: c. 65 m
- Listing: (none)
- Coordinates: 50°37′50″N 1°57′58″W

Geography
- Location within Dorset
- Location: Purbeck Hills, England
- OS grid: SZ025812
- Topo map: OS Landranger 195

Ballard Down is an area of chalk downland on the Purbeck Hills in the English county of Dorset. The hills meet the English Channel here, and Ballard Down forms a headland, Ballard Point, between Studland Bay to the north and Swanage Bay to the south. The chalk here forms part of a system of chalk downlands in southern England, and once formed a continuous ridge between what is now west Dorset and the present day Isle of Wight. Old Harry Rocks, just offshore from the dip slope of the down, and The Needles on the westernmost tip of the Isle of Wight, are remnants of this ridge. The scarp slope of the down faces south, over Swanage, meeting the sea as Ballard Cliff. The western end of the Isle of Wight, about 16 miles to the east, is readily visible from the down on a clear day.

The down was an area of calcareous grassland for up to 1000 years until World War II, when there was a sudden rise in the need for arable agricultural land. The down is now owned by the National Trust, and has largely been returned to grassland. The National Trust allows grazing on the down to prevent it becoming a natural beech woodland climax community.

Ballard Down forms the easternmost part of the Jurassic Coast World Heritage Site.

The BBC's adaptation of EM Forster's novel 'Howards End' (2017) used Ballard Down as a location.

== Obelisk ==
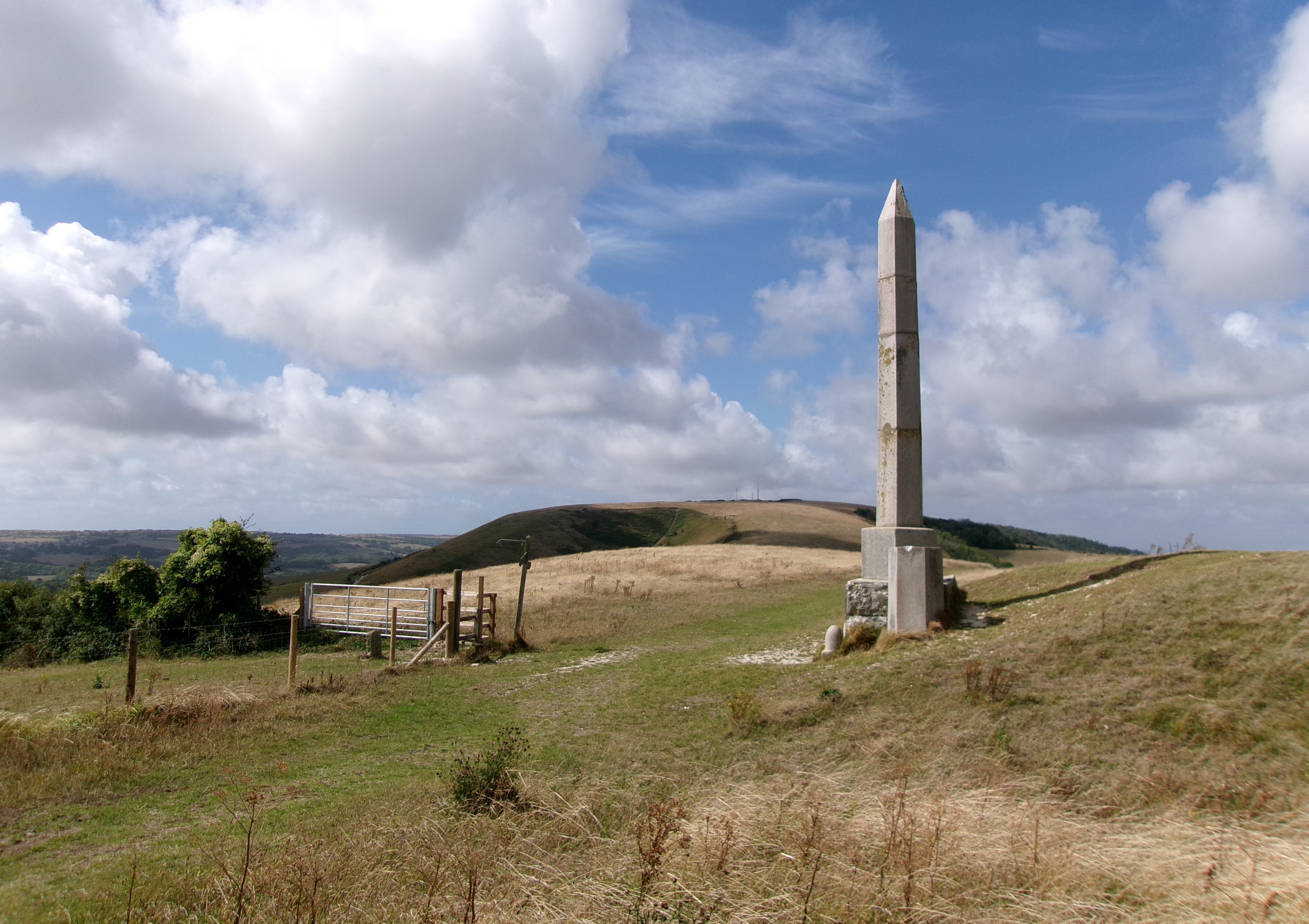
The obelisk at Ballard Down

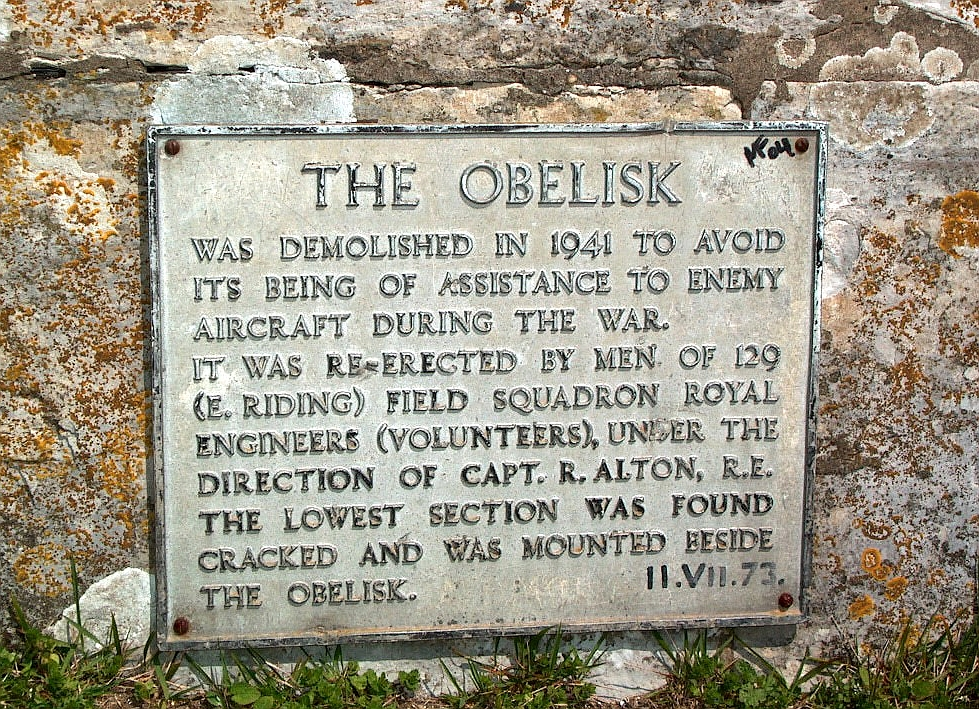
Plaque recording the removal and re-erection of the obelisk

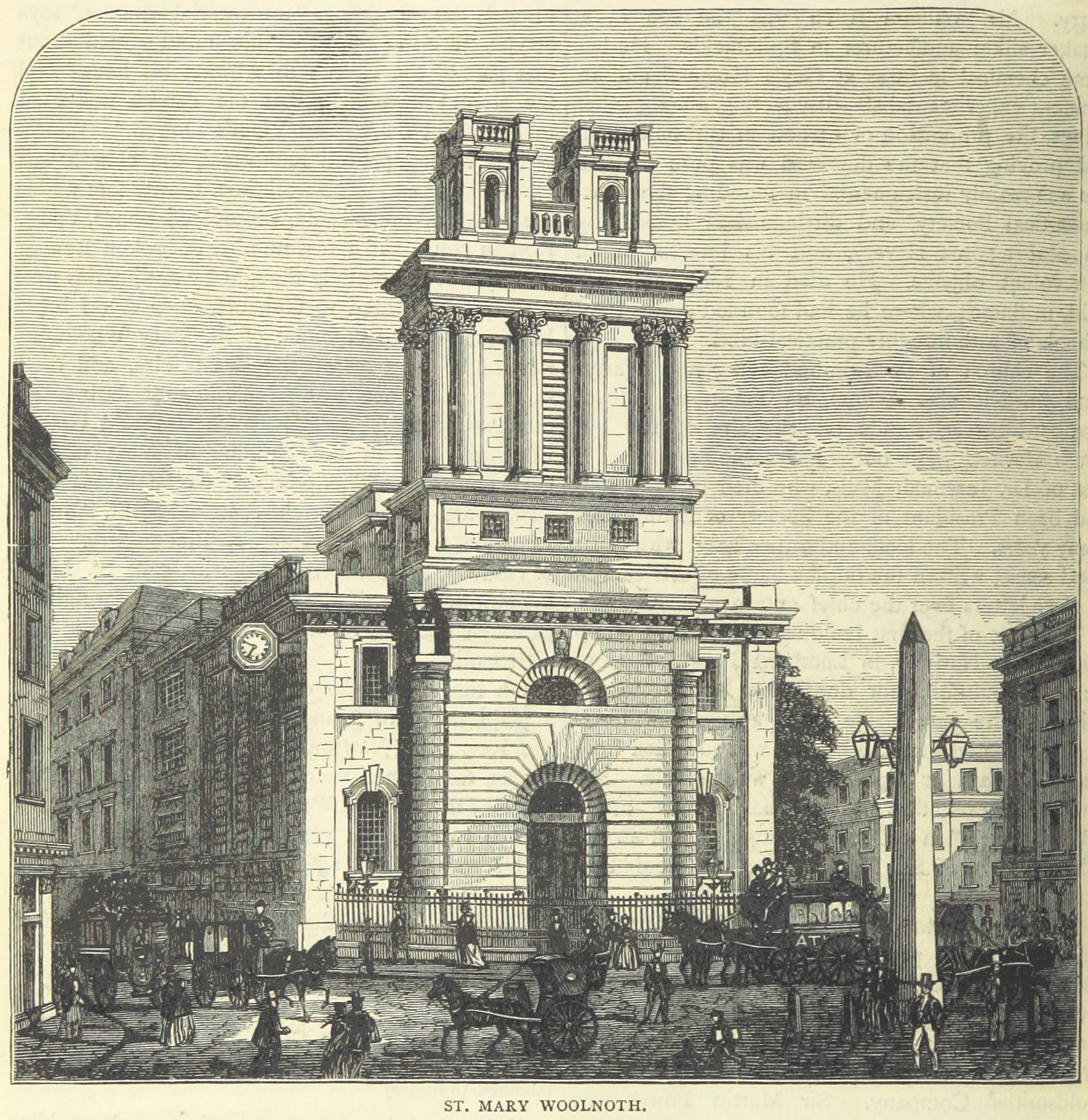
The monument in its original position outside St Mary Woolnoth

An obelisk at the western end of Ballard Down commemorates the provision of a new supply of drinking water for Swanage in 1883. Originally sited outside St Mary Woolnoth Church in central London, the obelisk was erected on its present site in 1892 by George Burt. It was taken down in 1941 as it was a landmark that might have aided enemy aircraft during World War II. According to some sources it was replaced in 1952, while others give a re-erection date of 1973. A plaque at the base of the obelisk, recording re-erection by Royal Engineers, is dated July 1973.
