= Ham Common, Dorset =

Nature reserve in Dorset, England

Coordinates: 50.717°N 2.029°W

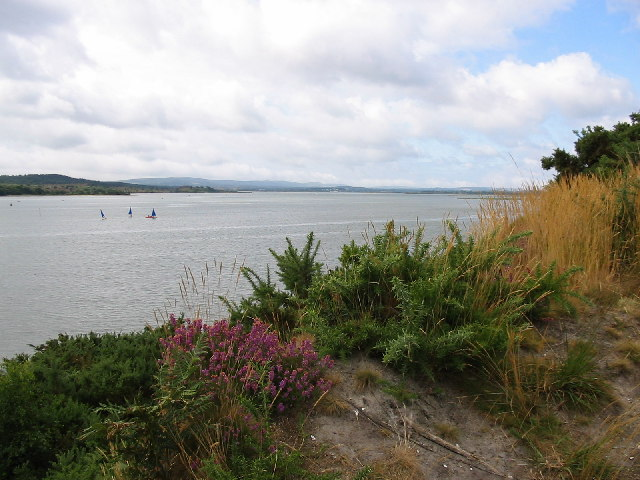
Ham Common overlooking Poole Harbour

Ham Common is a Local Nature Reserve at Hamworthy, near Poole, Dorset. Located on the north west shores of Poole Harbour, it is predominantly a heathland site but includes many other habitats including waste ground, mixed woodland, and a freshwater lake (Hamworthy Lake). Parking for the site can be found at Hamworthy Beach with access to the waterside for kayaking etc., or above the common from Napier Road. Easy walking access from Haven Rockley Holiday Park.

On 17 October 2003 Ham Common 'twinned' with Fleet Pond Local Nature Reserve in Hampshire. In 2006 a twinning event, and plaque unveiling, took place at Ham Common.

== Fauna ==
Over 200 bird species, 34 butterfly species, and 25 Odonata species have been logged in the reserve.

=== Birds ===
Birds inhabiting the reserve include the avocet, grey phalarope, osprey, Dartford warbler, yellow-browed warbler, serin, black-throated diver, hobby, peregrine falcon, wryneck, hoopoe and nightjar.

=== Butterflies ===
Butterflies inhabiting the reserve include the long-tailed blue, European swallowtail, purple hairstreak, grayling, silver-washed fritillary, dark green fritillary, brown argus and silver-studded blue.

=== Odonata ===
Odonata inhabiting the reserve include the red-eyed damselfly, southern damselfly, scarce blue-tailed damselfly, brown hawker, scarce chaser and keeled skimmer.
