= The Return of the Native =

1878 novel by Thomas Hardy

- Title page, Macmillan edition, 1929
- Author: Thomas Hardy
- Language: English
- Genre: Novel
- Publisher: Belgravia, the Magazine of Fashion and Amusement
- Publication date: 1878
- Publication place: United Kingdom
- Media type: Hardback & Paperback

The Return of the Native is the sixth published novel by English author Thomas Hardy. It first appeared in the magazine Belgravia, a publication known for its sensationalism, and was presented in 12 monthly instalments from 9 January to 19 December 1878. Because of the novel's controversial themes, Hardy had some difficulty finding a publisher; reviews, however, though somewhat mixed, were generally positive. In the 20th century, The Return of the Native became one of Hardy's popular and highly regarded novels.

== Plot summary ==
=== Book First: The Three Women ===
The novel takes place entirely in the environs of Egdon Heath, and with the exception of the epilogue, Aftercourses, covers exactly a year and a day. The narrative begins on the evening of Guy Fawkes Night as Diggory Venn is slowly crossing the heath with his van, which is being drawn by ponies. In his van is a passenger. When darkness falls, the country folk light bonfires on the surrounding hills, emphasising the pagan spirit of the heath and its denizens.

Venn is a reddleman, a seller of red ochre. He travels the country supplying farmers with a red mineral called reddle (dialect term for red ochre) that farmers use to mark their sheep. Although his trade has stained him red from head to foot, underneath his devilish colouring he is a handsome, shrewd and well-meaning young man. His passenger is a young woman named Thomasin Yeobright, whom Venn is taking home. Earlier that day, Thomasin had planned to marry Damon Wildeve, a local innkeeper known for his fickleness; however, an inconsistency in the marriage licence delayed the marriage. Thomasin, in distress, ran after the reddleman's van and asked him to take her home. Venn himself is in love with Thomasin, and unsuccessfully wooed her two years before. Now, although he believes Wildeve is unworthy of her love, he is so devoted to her that he is willing to help her secure the man of her choice.

At length, Venn reaches Bloom's End, the home of Thomasin's aunt, Mrs. Yeobright. She is a good woman, if somewhat proud and inflexible, and she wants the best for Thomasin. In former months she opposed her niece's choice of husband, and publicly forbade the banns; now, since Thomasin has compromised herself by leaving town with Wildeve and returning unmarried, the best outcome Mrs. Yeobright can envision is for the postponed marriage to be duly solemnised as soon as possible. She and Venn both begin working on Wildeve to make sure he keeps his promise to Thomasin.

Wildeve, however, is still preoccupied with Eustacia Vye, an exotically beautiful young woman living with her grandfather in a lonely house on Egdon Heath. Eustacia is a black-haired, queenly woman, whose Italian father came from Corfu, and who grew up in Budmouth, a fashionable seaside resort. She holds herself aloof from most of the heathfolk; they, in turn, consider her an oddity, and some even think she is a witch. She is nothing like Thomasin, who is sweet-natured. She loathes the heath, yet roams it constantly, carrying a spyglass and an hourglass. The previous year, she and Wildeve were lovers; however, even during the height of her passion for him, she knew she only loved him because there was no better object available. When Wildeve broke off the relationship to court Thomasin, Eustacia's interest in him briefly returned. The two meet on Guy Fawkes night, and Wildeve asks her to run off to America with him. She demurs.

=== Book Second: The Arrival ===
Eustacia drops Wildeve when Mrs. Yeobright's son Clym, a successful diamond merchant, returns from Paris to his native Egdon Heath. Although he has no plans to return to Paris or the diamond trade and is, in fact, planning to become a schoolmaster for the rural poor, Eustacia sees him as a way to escape the hated heath and begin a grander, richer existence in a glamorous new location. With some difficulty, she arranges to meet Clym, and the two soon fall in love. When Mrs. Yeobright objects, Clym quarrels with her; later, she quarrels with Eustacia as well.

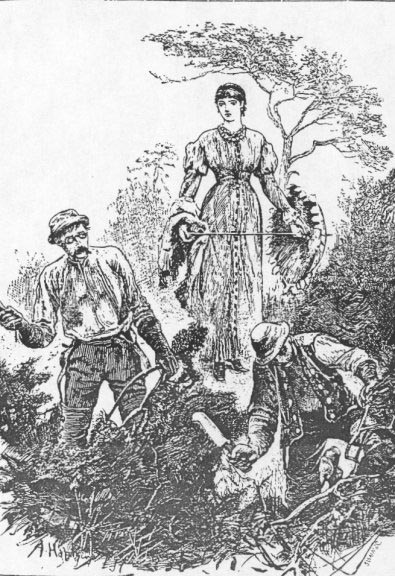
"Unconscious of her presence, he still went on singing." Eustacia watches Clym cut furze in this illustration by Arthur Hopkins for the original Belgravia edition (Plate 8, July 1878).

When he sees that Eustacia is lost to him, Wildeve marries Thomasin, who gives birth to a daughter the next summer. Clym and Eustacia also marry and move to a small cottage five miles away, where they enjoy a brief period of happiness. The seeds of rancour soon begin to germinate, however: Clym studies night and day to prepare for his new career as a schoolmaster while Eustacia clings to the hope that he'll give up the idea and take her abroad. Instead, he nearly blinds himself with too much reading, then further mortifies his wife by deciding to eke out a living, at least temporarily, as a furze-cutter. Eustacia, her dreams blasted, finds herself living in a hut on the heath, chained by marriage to a lowly labouring man.

=== Book Third: The Fascination ===
At this point, Wildeve reappears; he has unexpectedly inherited a large sum of money, and is now in a better position to fulfill Eustacia's hopes. He comes calling on the Yeobrights in the middle of one hot August day and, although Clym is at home, he is fast asleep on the hearth after a gruelling session of furze-cutting. While Eustacia and Wildeve are talking, Mrs. Yeobright knocks on the door; she has decided to pay a courtesy call in the hopes of healing the estrangement between herself and her son. Eustacia looks out at her and then, in some alarm, ushers her visitor out at the back door. She hears Clym calling to his mother and, thinking his mother's knocking has awakened him, remains in the garden for a few moments. When Eustacia goes back inside, she finds Clym still asleep and his mother gone. Clym, she now realises, merely cried out his mother's name in his sleep.

=== Book Four: The Closed Door ===
Mrs Yeobright, it turns out, saw Eustacia looking out the window at her; she also saw Clym's gear by the door, and so knew they were both at home. Now, thinking she has been deliberately barred from her son's home, she miserably begins the long, hot walk home. Later that evening, Clym, unaware of her attempted visit, heads for Bloom's End and on the way finds her crumpled beside the path, dying from an adder's bite. When she expires that night from the combined effects of snake venom and heat exhaustion, Clym's grief and remorse make him physically ill for several weeks. Eustacia, racked with guilt, dares not tell him of her role in the tragedy; when he eventually finds out from a neighbour's child about his mother's visit—and Wildeve's—he rushes home to accuse his wife of murder and adultery. Eustacia refuses to explain her actions; instead, she tells him "You are no blessing, my husband" and reproaches him for his cruelty. She then moves back to her grandfather's house, where she struggles with her despair while she awaits some word from Clym.

=== Book Fifth: The Discovery ===
Wildeve visits Eustacia again on Guy Fawkes night, and offers to help her get to Paris. Eustacia realises that if she lets Wildeve help her, she'll be obliged to become his mistress. She tells him she will send him a signal by night if she decides to accept. Clym's anger, meanwhile, has cooled and he sends Eustacia a letter the next day offering reconciliation. The letter arrives a few minutes too late; by the time her grandfather tries to give it to her, she has already signalled to Wildeve and set off through wind and rain to meet him. She walks along weeping, however, knowing she is about to break her marriage vows for a man who is unworthy of her.

Wildeve readies a horse and gig and waits for Eustacia in the dark. Thomasin, guessing his plans, sends Clym to intercept him; she also, by chance, encounters Diggory Venn as she dashes across the heath herself in pursuit of her husband. Eustacia does not appear; instead, she falls or throws herself into nearby Shadwater Weir. Clym and Wildeve hear the splash and hurry to investigate. Wildeve plunges recklessly after Eustacia without bothering to remove his coat, while Clym, proceeding more cautiously, nevertheless is also soon at the mercy of the raging waters. Venn arrives in time to save Clym, but is too late for the others. When Clym revives, he accuses himself of murdering his wife and mother.

=== Book Sixth: The Aftercourses ===
In the epilogue, Clym and Thomasin are cohabitating in his Mother's house. Clym mostly contemplates his future and decides to become a wandering preacher and educator. Thomasin, who has inherited Wildeve's sudden money, happily takes care of her child. In brief consideration, Clym debates whether or not to marry his cousin out of obligation to his Mother's far-flung wishes but Venn gives up being a reddleman to become a moderately wealthy dairy farmer and has been courting Thomasin again-losing all strange appearance issues of dealing with the red dye. Venn and Thomasin have an obvious bond and Clym happily approves of his cousin's attraction to a "good man." Two years later, Thomasin marries him and they settle down happily together. Clym, now a sad, solitary figure, eventually takes up preaching theory and philosophy to furze cutters and other locals while they work in the heath. He is considered by the locals to be a somewhat pathetic person as he stands on ancient ruins to spout his knowledge.

==== Alternative ending ====
In a footnote towards the end of the novel in some compendium editions, Hardy writes:

The writer may state here that the original conception of the story did not design a marriage between Thomasin and Venn. He was to have retained his isolated and weird character to the last … Thomasin remaining a widow ... But certain circumstances of serial publication led to a change of intent. Readers can therefore choose between the endings, and those with an austere artistic code can assume the more consistent conclusion to be the true one.

== Reception ==
With its deeply flawed heroine and its (for the time) open acknowledgement of illicit sexual relationships, The Return of the Native raised some eyebrows when it first appeared as a serial in Victorian Britain. Although he intended to structure the novel into five books, thus mirroring the classical tragic format, Hardy submitted to the tastes of the serial-reading public sufficiently to tack on a happy ending for Diggory Venn and Thomasin in a sixth book, Aftercourses. In Hardy's original conception, Venn retains his weird reddleman's character, and Thomasin lives out her days as a widow.

Hardy's choice of themes—sexual politics, thwarted desire, and the conflicting demands of nature and society—makes this a truly modern novel. Underlying these modern themes, however, is a classical sense of tragedy: Hardy scrupulously observes the three unities of time, place, and action and suggests that the struggles of those trying to escape their destinies will only hasten their destruction. To emphasise this main part he uses as setting an ancient heath steeped in pre-Christian history and supplies a Chorus consisting of Grandfer Cantle, Timothy Fairway, and the rest of the heathfolk. Eustacia, who manipulates fate in hopes of leaving Egdon Heath for a larger existence in Paris, instead becomes an eternal resident when she drowns in Shadwater Weir; Wildeve shares not only Eustacia's dream of escape, but also her fate; and Clym, the would-be educational reformer, survives the Weir but lives on as a lonely, remorseful man who preaches his own gospel. Ironically, despite his education and previous success, is considered a pathetic figure by the working class in the heath. Those who accept the heath and it's provincial limitations are oddly rewarded by wealth and happiness. Those who attempt to change it are defeated.

Some critics—notably D. H. Lawrence—see the novel as a study of the way communities control their misfits. In Egdon Heath, most people (particularly the women) look askance at the proud, unconventional Eustacia. Mrs. Yeobright considers her too odd and unreliable to be a suitable bride for her son, and Susan Nunsuch, who frankly believes her to be a witch, tries to protect her children from Eustacia's supposedly baleful influence by stabbing her with a stocking pin and later burning her in effigy. Clym at first laughs at such superstitions, but later embraces the majority opinion when he rejects his wife as a murderer and adulteress. In this view, Eustacia dies because she has internalised the community's values to the extent that, unable to escape Egdon without confirming her status as a fallen woman, she chooses suicide. She thereby ends her sorrows while at the same time—by drowning in the weir like any woman instead of floating, witchlike—she proves her essential innocence to the community.

== Character list ==
- Clement (Clym) Yeobright—A man of about thirty who gives up a business career in Paris to return to his native Egdon Heath to become a "schoolmaster to the poor and ignorant" (Hardy himself gave up a successful career as a London architect and returned to his native Dorchester to become a writer). "The beauty here visible would in no time be ruthlessly overrun by its parasite, thought." Clym is the "native" to which the book's title refers.
- Eustacia Vye—A raven-haired young beauty who chafes against her life on the heath and longs to escape it to lead the more adventure-filled life of the world. Some of the heathfolk think she is a witch. Hardy describes her as "the raw material of a divinity" whose "celestial imperiousness, love, wrath, and fervour had proved to be somewhat thrown away on netherward Egdon."
- Mrs. Yeobright—Clym’s mother, a widow of inflexible standards. Thomasin has lived with her for many years, but Clym is her only child. She strongly disapproves of Eustacia.
- Thomasin (Tamsin) Yeobright—Clym’s cousin and Mrs. Yeobright's niece, a young girl of gentle ways and conventional expectations. In Hardy's original manuscript, Wildeve tricks her with a false marriage to seduce her. "Mrs Yeobright saw a little figure...undefended except by the power of her own hope."
- Damon Wildeve—Eustacia's former lover and Thomasin's first husband. He is an ex-engineer who has failed in his profession and who now keeps an inn, "The Quiet Woman"—so-called because its sign depicts a decapitated woman carrying her own head. He has a wandering eye and an appetite for women. "A lady killing career."
- Diggory Venn—A resourceful man of twenty-four and a reddleman (a travelling seller of reddle, red chalk used for marking sheep). He selflessly protects Thomasin throughout the novel despite the fact that she refused to marry him two years before. He keeps a watchful eye on Eustacia to make sure Wildeve doesn't go back to her. At the end, he renounces his trade to become a dairy farmer like his father, and in doing so loses the red skin. He is then seen as a suitable husband for Thomasin. Venn's red coloration and frequent narrative references to his 'Mephistophelean' or diabolical character are symbolic and important. In one particularly significant chapter ("The Morning and Evening of an Eventful Day"), Venn displays an increasingly unlikely string of good luck, repeatedly rolling dice and defeating a rival. This event makes Venn something of a deus ex machina as well as a quasi-magical figure. While Hardy abandons these aspects of Venn's character by the end of the novel, during his 'reddleman' phase, Venn lends elements of magical realism and what modern readers would understand to be superheroic elements to the novel.
- Captain Drew—Eustacia’s grandfather and a former naval officer (renamed Captain Vye in later editions).
- Timothy Fairway—A sententious man of middle age who is greatly respected by the other heathfolk.
- Grandfer Cantle—A somewhat senile and always lively ex-soldier of about sixty-nine.
- Christian Cantle—Grandfer Cantle's fearful and timid thirty-one-year-old son.
- Humphrey—Clym's eventual colleague, a furze cutter (furze is a low, prickly shrub more commonly called gorse).
- Susan Nunsuch—Eustacia's nearest neighbour and bitterest enemy who convinces herself that Eustacia's witchery has caused her son's sickliness. In a memorable scene, Susan tries to protect him by making a wax effigy of Eustacia, sticking it full of pins, and melting it in her fireplace while uttering the Lord's Prayer backward. Eustacia drowns later that night.
- Johnny Nunsuch—Susan’s son, a young boy. He encounters Mrs. Yeobright during her fatal walk home and, in obedience to her wishes, reports her last words to Clym: I am a broken-hearted woman cast off by my son.
- Charley—A sixteen-year-old boy who works for Captain Drew and who admires Eustacia, largely from afar.
- Egdon Heath—The setting for all the novel's events; considered by some critics to be the leading character as well. It is profoundly ancient, the scene of intense but long-forgotten pagan lives. As its tumuli attest, it is also a graveyard that has swallowed countless generations of inhabitants without changing much itself. To Thomasin, Clym, and Diggory, it is a benign, natural place; in Eustacia's eyes, it becomes a malevolent presence intent on destroying her.

== Adaptations ==
The Return of the Native was filmed for Hallmark Hall of Fame and broadcast on television in 1994. It was filmed in Exmoor National Park. The film stars Catherine Zeta Jones as Eustacia Vye, Clive Owen as Damon Wildeve, Ray Stevenson as Clym Yeobright, and Joan Plowright as Mrs. Yeobright. Jack Gold directed.

In 2010, an Americanised film adaptation of The Return of the Native was directed by Ben Westbrook. It is set in the Appalachian Mountains in the 1930s during The Great Depression.

In 1956, a Bengali film starring Uttam Kumar and Mala Sinha titled Putrabadhu (trans:Daughter-in-Law) was released. The plot was based roughly on Hardy's novel, but with a happy ending.

The novel has also been adapted for the stage several times. Dance on a Country Grave is a musical stage adaptation by Kelly Hamilton. On 15 June 1948, a radio adaptation featuring Michael Redgrave aired on CBS's Studio One.
