= Harry Paye =

English privateer and smuggler

Henry Paye (died 1419), also known as Haza, Page or Arripaye (to the Spanish), was a privateer and smuggler from Poole, Dorset in the late 14th and early 15th century, who became a commander in the Cinque Ports fleet.

He intercepted hundreds of French ships for gold, wine, exotic fruits and brought it back to the people of Poole.

Paye led naval raids along the coast of France and Spain from Normandy through to the Bay of Biscay and Cape Finisterre. He burnt Gijón and Finisterra to the ground, taking many prisoners and exacting ransoms, and in 1398 he raided the Church of Saint Mary in Finisterra and stole a valuable crucifix. He also helped quell the Welsh revolts brought about by Owain Glyndŵr, defeating a French fleet sent to aid the uprising.

In 1405, a combined fleet of French and Spanish ships attacked Paye's native town of Poole in retaliation for Paye's raids. The attackers looted arms and stores and set fire to a warehouse before they were driven back to their ships by the townspeople. Although Paye was not present in Poole during the raid, his brother was among those killed by the attackers. During an expedition in 1406, he captured 120 French prizes off the coast of Brittany laden with iron, salt and oil.

Paye died in 1419 and was buried in the parish church at Faversham, Kent, where under the name of 'Henry Pay, Armiger' his death is recorded by a monumental brass which includes a coat of arms, paly, a mascle voided and flory.

Paye is celebrated in the annual Harry Paye Charity Fun Day parade held in Poole every June, while Rosemary Manning wrote a children's novel based on his life, Arripay (1963).
