= Agglestone Rock =

Rock formation in Dorset, England

Coordinates: 50.645083°N 1.968125°W

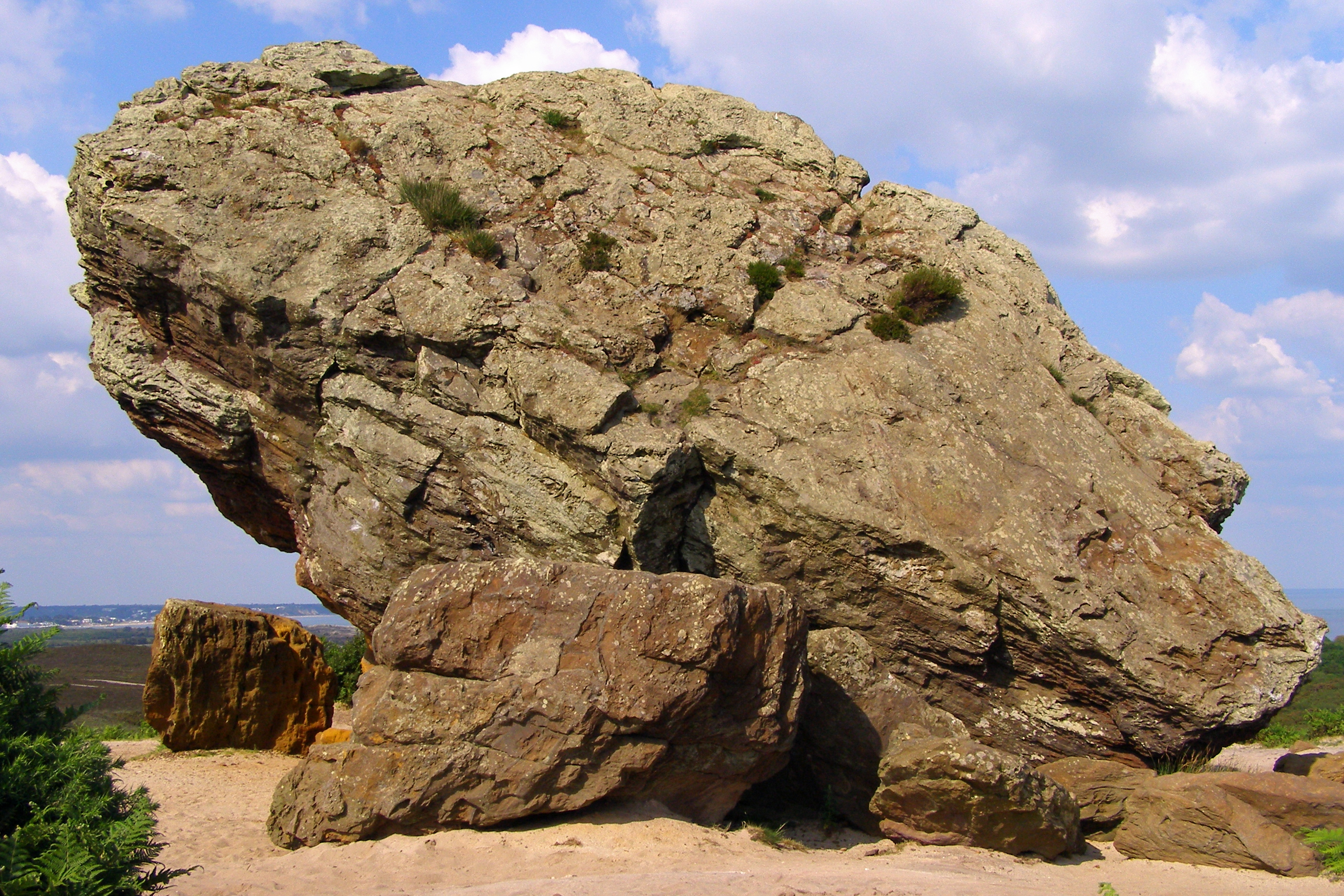
The Agglestone

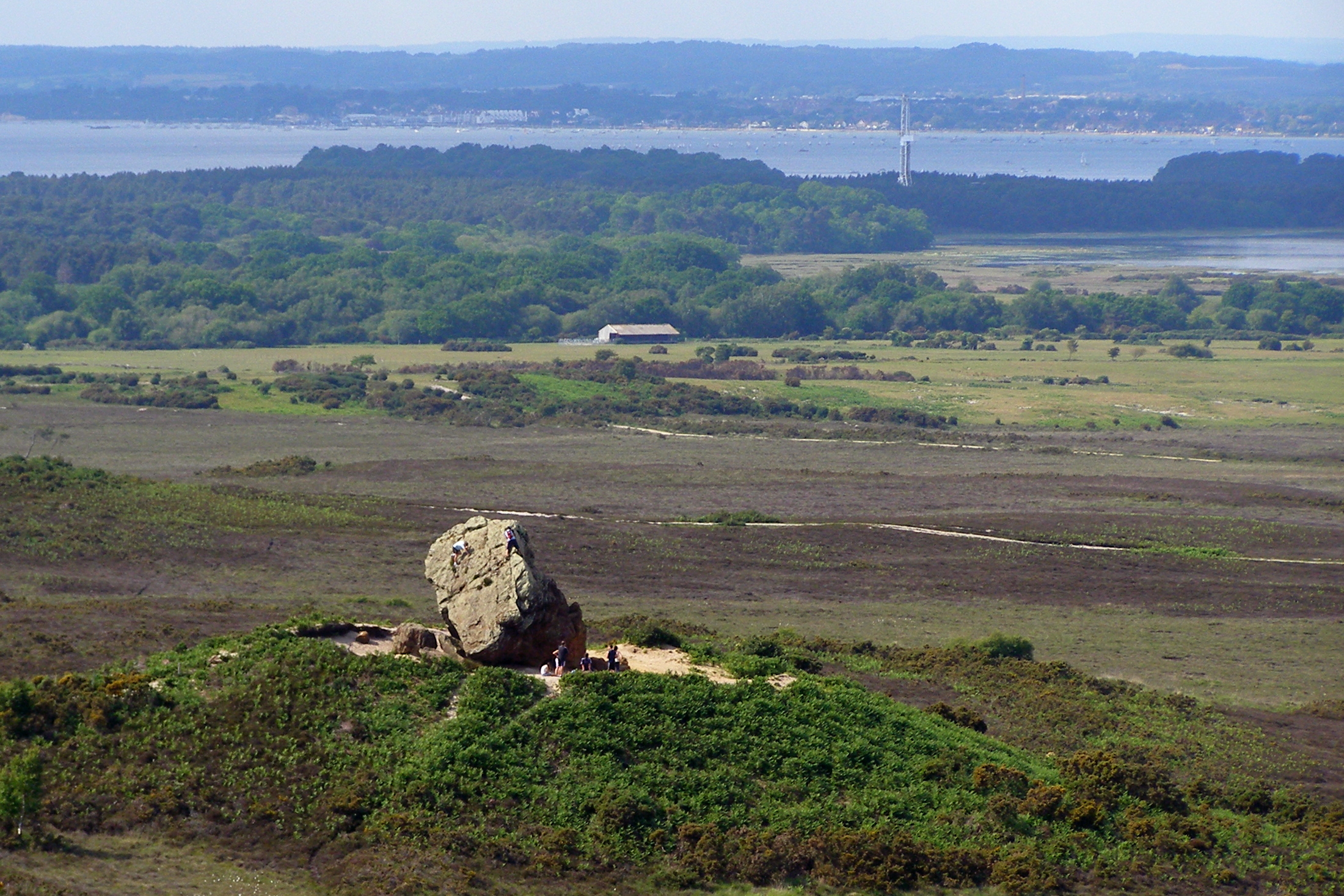
Agglestone Rock on Black Heath, near Studland

Agglestone Rock, also known as the Devil's Anvil, is a sandstone block of about 400 tonnes weight, perched on a conical hill, approximately 1-mile (1.6 km) from the village of Studland, south Dorset. Formerly an 'anvil' shape with a flat top, it fell onto one end and side in 1970, leaving the top at an angle of approximately 45°.

Legend has it that the devil threw the rock from The Needles on the Isle of Wight with the intention of hitting either Corfe Castle, Bindon Abbey or Salisbury Cathedral. "Aggle" was taken into the old Dorset dialect as meaning "to wobble".

== Geology ==
The rock is an "eroded relic of iron-cemented, Tertiary sandstone, the Agglestone Grit". It used to be anvil-shaped, but has since changed form due to erosion and been toppled.

Visiting the rock was listed by the Dorset Echo as one of the "25 Things To Do In Dorset Before You Die".

== Mythology ==
In his 1927 book Downland Man, H.J. Massingham wrote:

A musing stroll across the heath from Studland, brings you to the Aggllestone, the holy stone (Helig - Anglo-Saxon for holy) hurled by the devil on to the crest of a hillock rising above the peaty waste. Fiends often do dress like angels, and it is certainly hard to detect anything of the devil when the Madonna-blue chalices of that visionary flower, Gentiana pneumonanthe, are open on the heath. But devils did traffic with holy stones in archaic England, for devils were once gods themselves fallen from heaven upon evil days, the days when the usurping Celts looked with dread upon the works of their predecessors. For the Agglestone is a menhir.
