= List of Private Passions episodes (2000–2004) =

This is a list of Private Passions episodes from 2000 to 2004. It does not include repeated episodes or compilations.

== 2000 ==
Date	Guest	Composer	Title	Performer / Label
8 Jan 2000	John Caird	Wolfgang Amadeus Mozart	"Ruhe sanft, mein holdes Leben" (from Zaide)	
8 Jan 2000	John Caird	W. A. Mozart	Sanctus (from Requiem, K. 626)	
8 Jan 2000	John Caird	Franz Schubert	"Wohin?" (No. 2 from Die schöne Müllerin)	
8 Jan 2000	John Caird	Johann Sebastian Bach	Sinfonia No. 14 in B♭, BWV 800	
8 Jan 2000	John Caird	Ludwig van Beethoven	Quartet in B♭, Op. 130 (5th movement: Cavatina: Adagio molto espressivo)	
8 Jan 2000	John Caird	Leonard Bernstein	Finale: "Make our garden grow" (from Candide)	
8 Jan 2000	John Caird	Frédéric Chopin	Piano Sonata No. 3 in B minor (finale)	
8 Jan 2000	John Caird	Henryk Górecki	Symphony No. 3 (3rd movement)	
8 Jan 2000	John Caird	W. A. Mozart	Oboe Quartet in F, K. 370 (3rd movement – Rondo: Allegro)	
15 Jan 2000	Jonathan Raban	J. S. Bach	Toccata and Fugue in D minor, BWV 565	
15 Jan 2000	Jonathan Raban	Benjamin Britten	"Dies Irae" (from War Requiem)	
15 Jan 2000	Jonathan Raban	Don McLean	"American Pie"	
15 Jan 2000	Jonathan Raban	Edward Elgar	"Ecce sacerdos magnus"	
15 Jan 2000	Jonathan Raban	W. A. Mozart	"Agnus Dei" (from Coronation Mass, K. 317)	
15 Jan 2000	Jonathan Raban	Henry Purcell	March (from Music for the Funeral of Queen Mary)	
15 Jan 2000	Jonathan Raban	Schubert	Quintet in A major, D. 667, Trout Quintet (3rd movement – Scherzo)	
15 Jan 2000	Jonathan Raban	Traditional music	"The Oak and the Ash"	
22 Jan 2000	John Richardson	Sergei Rachmaninoff	Aleko's Cavatina (from Aleko)	
22 Jan 2000	John Richardson	Artie Singer, John Medora, David White	"At the Hop"	
22 Jan 2000	John Richardson	Antonio Soler	Fandango	
22 Jan 2000	John Richardson	Paul Knepler and Ignaz Michael Welleminsky and Theo Mackeben – Carl Millöcker	"Ich schenk mein Herz" (Die Dubarry)	
22 Jan 2000	John Richardson	Giacomo Puccini	"O principe" (from Turandot, act 2)	
22 Jan 2000	John Richardson	Franz Liszt	"O quand je dors"	
22 Jan 2000	John Richardson	Igor Stravinsky	"The Birth of Apollo" (from Apollo, Scene 1)	
22 Jan 2000	John Richardson	John Richardson	The Sorcerer's Apprentice	
22 Jan 2000	John Richardson	John Richardson	The Sorcerer's Apprentice	
22 Jan 2000	John Richardson	Britten	"I know a bank" (from A Midsummer Night's Dream, act 1)	
22 Jan 2000	John Richardson	Lothar Brühne and Bruno Balz	"Der Wind hat mir ein Lied erzählt" (from the film La Habanera)	
29 Jan 2000	John Suchet	Giuseppe Verdi	"Di Provenza il mar" (from La traviata)	
29 Jan 2000	John Suchet	Kid Ory	"Ory's Creole Trombone"	
29 Jan 2000	John Suchet	Richard Wagner	Prelude to Parsifal, act 1	
29 Jan 2000	John Suchet	Joseph Canteloube	Rossignolet qui chantes (from New Songs of the Auvergne)	
29 Jan 2000	John Suchet	Henri Christiné and Frankie O'Rourke and Albert Willemetz	Valentine	
29 Jan 2000	John Suchet	Beethoven	"Mir ist so wunderbar" (from Fidelio)	
29 Jan 2000	John Suchet	Beethoven	Quartet in F, Op. 135 (3rd movement – Lento assai e cantante tranquillo)	
5 Feb 2000	Susannah Fiennes	Bach	Prelude and Fugue in C♯ major (from The Well-Tempered Clavier, book 2)	
5 Feb 2000	Susannah Fiennes	Leonard Bernstein	Chichester Psalms (1st movement) (pub. Schirmer)	
5 Feb 2000	Susannah Fiennes	Brahms	Geistliches Lied, Op. 30	
5 Feb 2000	Susannah Fiennes	Handel	"Dominus a dextris tuis" (from Dixit Dominus)	
5 Feb 2000	Susannah Fiennes	Schubert	Sonata in A minor – "Arpeggione" (2nd movement – Adagio)	
5 Feb 2000	Susannah Fiennes	Robert Schumann	"Ich will meine Seele tauchen" (from Dichterliebe, Op. 48)	
5 Feb 2000	Susannah Fiennes	Shostakovich	Quartet No. 10 in A♭, Op. 118 (1st movement – Andante)	
5 Feb 2000	Susannah Fiennes	Wagner	Parsifal (conclusion of act 1)	
12 Feb 2000	Barrie Gavin	Béla Bartók	String Quartet No. 4 (5th movement – Allegro molto)	
12 Feb 2000	Barrie Gavin	Pierre Boulez	Notations 3 (Très Modéré)	
12 Feb 2000	Barrie Gavin	Elgar	Symphony No. 2 in E♭, Op. 63 (3rd movement – Rondo: Presto)	
12 Feb 2000	Barrie Gavin	Karol Szymanowski	Stabat Mater (last movement)	
12 Feb 2000	Barrie Gavin	Traditional music	"Al Bahr al Gharan Wasal"	
12 Feb 2000	Barrie Gavin	Traditional music	"Shady Grove"	
12 Feb 2000	Barrie Gavin	Traditional music	Stroudwater	
12 Feb 2000	Barrie Gavin	Verdi	"Dinne...alcun là non vedesti?" (from Simon Boccanegra)	
19 Feb 2000	Jatinder Verma	Leonard Bernstein	"America" (from West Side Story) (Original Broadway cast)	
19 Feb 2000	Jatinder Verma	Mukesh	"Awara Hoon" (from the film Awara)	
19 Feb 2000	Jatinder Verma	Kris Kristofferson	"Help Me Make It Through the Night"	
19 Feb 2000	Jatinder Verma	Nusrat Fateh Ali Khan	"Huq Ali Ali Haq"	
19 Feb 2000	Jatinder Verma	Traditional music	"Raga Marwa"	
19 Feb 2000	Jatinder Verma	Beethoven	Sonata in F minor, Op. 57 – Appassionata (1st movement – Allegro assai – opening)	
19 Feb 2000	Jatinder Verma	Jimmy Page and Robert Plant	"Stairway to Heaven"	
19 Feb 2000	Jatinder Verma	Bach	Double Violin Concerto in D minor, BWV 1043 (2nd movement – Largo ma non tanto)	
19 Feb 2000	Jatinder Verma	Beethoven	Piano Concerto No. 5 in E♭, Op. 73 – Emperor (3rd movement – Rondo – conclusion)	
26 Feb 2000	Gerald Sinstadt	Beethoven	Quartet in B♭, Op. 18/6 (1st movement – Allegro con brio)	
26 Feb 2000	Gerald Sinstadt	Britten	Finale – Finale (from A Midsummer Night's Dream)	
26 Feb 2000	Gerald Sinstadt	Charlie Barnet	"Skyliner"	
26 Feb 2000	Gerald Sinstadt	Haydn	Symphony No. 46 in B (Finale)	
26 Feb 2000	Gerald Sinstadt	Édouard Lalo	Aubade – Vainement, ma bien aimée (from Le Roi d'Ys)	
26 Feb 2000	Gerald Sinstadt	Gustav Mahler	"Ging heut' Morgen übers Feld" (from Lieder eines fahrenden Gesellen)	
26 Feb 2000	Gerald Sinstadt	Pyotr Ilyich Tchaikovsky	"If Only I Had known", Op. 47/1	
26 Feb 2000	Gerald Sinstadt	Verdi	"Rivedrai le foreste imbalsamente" (from Aida)	
4 Mar 2000	Piers Plowright	Bach	Partita No. 1 in B♭ major (Menuet I & II)	
4 Mar 2000	Piers Plowright	Beethoven	Sonata for piano Op. 57 in F minor (Appassionata)	
4 Mar 2000	Piers Plowright	Hector Berlioz	"Un bal" (2nd movement) from Symphonie fantastique	
4 Mar 2000	Piers Plowright	Haydn	String Quartet in D minor, Op. 76, No. 2	
4 Mar 2000	Piers Plowright	Johnny Mercer	"I Love You" (from The Johnny Mercer Songbook)	
4 Mar 2000	Piers Plowright	N/A	Japanese rice-wine seller calling his wares	
4 Mar 2000	Piers Plowright	Quincy Jones	"Count 'Em" (from Compact Jazz)	
4 Mar 2000	Piers Plowright	Traditional music	Sardinian Shepherd's Song – T'amo	
4 Mar 2000	Piers Plowright	Tomás Luis de Victoria	Requiem (1605) (Kyrie)	
11 Mar 2000	Penelope Farmer	Harrison Birtwistle	Earth Dances(conclusion)	
11 Mar 2000	Penelope Farmer	Boulez	"Complainte du lézard amoureux" (from Le Soleil des eaux)	
11 Mar 2000	Penelope Farmer	Sofia Gubaidulina	"Weib, siehe, das ist dein Sohn" (from Sieben Worte)	
11 Mar 2000	Penelope Farmer	Haydn	Quartet in E♭, Op. 76/6 (3rd movement – Menuetto: Presto)	
11 Mar 2000	Penelope Farmer	Leoš Janáček	The Makropoulos Case	
11 Mar 2000	Penelope Farmer	Marks Mankwane and Rupert Bopape	Izingubo Ezimhlophe	
11 Mar 2000	Penelope Farmer	W. A. Mozart	Divertimento for String Trio in E♭, K. 563 (2nd movement – Adagio)	
11 Mar 2000	Penelope Farmer	Karol Szymanowski	"Stabat Mater" (5th movement)	
18 Mar 2000	John Cale	Brian Wilson and Gary Usher	"In My Room"	
18 Mar 2000	John Cale	Beck and Karl Stephenson	"Loser"	
18 Mar 2000	John Cale	John Cage	4'33" (part)	
18 Mar 2000	John Cale	John Cale	"Ari Sleepy Too" (from Dance Music – Nico the Ballet)	
18 Mar 2000	John Cale	Jonathan Richman	"Roadrunner"	
18 Mar 2000	John Cale	Lou Reed	"Heroin" (album: The Velvet Underground & Nico)	
18 Mar 2000	John Cale	Roy Harris	Opening – Symphony no. 3	
18 Mar 2000	John Cale	Heitor Villa-Lobos	Aria – 1st movement Bachianas Brasileiras no. 5	
25 Mar 2000	John Calder	Schubert	"Death and the Maiden", D531	
25 Mar 2000	John Calder	Richard Strauss	"Es gibt ein Reich" (from Ariadne auf Naxos)	
25 Mar 2000	John Calder	Beethoven	"My Faithful Johnny" (Scottish Folk Song Arrangements, Op. 108)	
25 Mar 2000	John Calder	Harrison Birtwistle	Tableaux 4 and 5 – Autumn and Winter (The Turning of the Seasons, from Gawain)	
25 Mar 2000	John Calder	Christoph Willibald Gluck	"Divinités du Styx" (from Alceste)	
25 Mar 2000	John Calder	Handel	"Verdi prati" (from Alcina)	
25 Mar 2000	John Calder	W. A. Mozart	"Dies irae" (Requiem)	
25 Mar 2000	John Calder	Stravinsky	"I burn, I freeze" (from The Rake's Progress, Graveyard Scene)	
25 Mar 2000	John Calder	Anton Webern	"Sehr langsam" (no. 3 of 5 Orchestral Pieces, Op. 10)	
1 Apr 2000	Christopher Frayling	Elgar	"Nimrod" (from Variations on an original theme Enigma, Op. 36)	
1 Apr 2000	Christopher Frayling	Ennio Morricone	"La Resi dei Conti" (from For a Few Dollars More)	
1 Apr 2000	Christopher Frayling	Gluck	"What is life to me without thee?" (from Orfeo ed Euridice)	
1 Apr 2000	Christopher Frayling	Ian Dury	"Reasons to Be Cheerful (Part 3)"	
1 Apr 2000	Christopher Frayling	W. A. Mozart	"Der Hölle Rache" (Die Zauberflöte, act 2, scene 3)	
1 Apr 2000	Christopher Frayling	Jean-Jacques Rousseau	Le devin du village	
1 Apr 2000	Christopher Frayling	Shostakovich	Symphony No. 7, The Leningrad, 1st movement	
1 Apr 2000	Christopher Frayling	Kurt Weill	"Die Moritat von Mackie Messer" (from Kleine Dreigroschenmusik)	
8 Apr 2000	David Cairns	Bach	Brandenburg Concerto No. 5 in D, BWV 1050	
8 Apr 2000	David Cairns	Beethoven	Quartet in A minor, Op. 132	
8 Apr 2000	David Cairns	Britten	Mad Scene (from Peter Grimes, act 3)	
8 Apr 2000	David Cairns	Elgar	Sanctus Fortis (from The Dream of Gerontius)	
8 Apr 2000	David Cairns	Doris Fisher and Allan Roberts	"You Always Hurt the One You Love"	
8 Apr 2000	David Cairns	W. A. Mozart	Symphony No. 39 in E♭, K. 543	
8 Apr 2000	David Cairns	Stravinsky	"Pas de Quatre" (from Agon)	
8 Apr 2000	David Cairns	Michael Tippett	The Midsummer Marriage (opening of act 2)	
8 Apr 2000	David Cairns	Verdi	"È sogno? o realtà?" (from Falstaff, act 2, scene 1)	
8 Apr 2000	David Cairns	Wagner	Overture: Die Meistersinger	
15 Apr 2000	Kevin Carey	J. S. Bach	The Well-Tempered Clavier, book 1 (Prelude in D minor, BWV 851)	
15 Apr 2000	Kevin Carey	Berio	Sinfonia (3rd movement)	
15 Apr 2000	Kevin Carey	Britten	"Te Deum"	
15 Apr 2000	Kevin Carey	William Byrd	"Ave verum Corpus"	
15 Apr 2000	Kevin Carey	Dallapiccola	Largo (No. 1 from 5 Fragments of Saffo)	
15 Apr 2000	Kevin Carey	Gary Burton and Keith Jarrett	"Moon Child" (from In Your Quiet Place)	
15 Apr 2000	Kevin Carey	Mahler	Symphony No. 9 (finale)	
15 Apr 2000	Kevin Carey	Rameau	Last recitative, aria and chorus (from Hippolyte et Aricie, act 5, scene 8)	
15 Apr 2000	Kevin Carey	Schubert	Piano Sonata in B♭, D960 (2nd movement Andante sostenuto)	
22 Apr 2000	Phyllida Lloyd	Britten	Second duet (from Gloriana, act 3, scene 2)	
22 Apr 2000	Phyllida Lloyd	Gilbert and Sullivan	The Mikado (conclusion of act 1)	
22 Apr 2000	Phyllida Lloyd	Lewis Carroll	"The Croquet Game" (from Alice in Wonderland)	
22 Apr 2000	Phyllida Lloyd	Thomas Morris and Fats Waller	"Please take me out of jail"	
22 Apr 2000	Phyllida Lloyd	Francis Poulenc	Dialogues des Carmélites (final scene)	
22 Apr 2000	Phyllida Lloyd	Verdi	Recordare (from Messa da Requiem)	
22 Apr 2000	Phyllida Lloyd	Verdi	"Una macchia è qui tuttora" (Sleepwalking scene from Macbeth, act 4, scene 2)	
29 Apr 2000	Dave Holland	Béla Bartók	Concerto for Orchestra/Dance Suite	
29 Apr 2000	Dave Holland	Charles Mingus	2BS	
29 Apr 2000	Dave Holland	Dave Holland	"Homecoming"	
29 Apr 2000	Dave Holland	John Coltrane	A Love Supreme – Part One	
29 Apr 2000	Dave Holland	Miles Davis and Gil Evans	"My Ship"	
29 Apr 2000	Dave Holland	Bennie Moten and Ralph Peer	"Moten Swing"	
29 Apr 2000	Dave Holland	N/A	"Gloria's Step"	
29 Apr 2000	Dave Holland	Billy Strayhorn	UMMG	
6 May 2000	Donna Leon	Vincenzo Bellini	"Casta Diva" (from Norma) arr. Celso Valli	
6 May 2000	Donna Leon	Handel	"Gird on thy Sword" (from Saul)	
6 May 2000	Donna Leon	Handel	"Ombre Pallide" (from Alcina)	
6 May 2000	Donna Leon	Handel	Vivi, tiranno (from Rodelinda)	
6 May 2000	Donna Leon	W. A. Mozart	"Se viver non degg'io" (from Mitridate, Re di Ponto)	
6 May 2000	Donna Leon	Trad. arr. Carl Doy	"Haere ra e Hine"	
6 May 2000	Donna Leon	Verdi	"Di quella pira" (from Il trovatore)	
6 May 2000	Donna Leon	Vivaldi	"Anch'il mar par che sommerga" (from Il Tamerlano)	
13 May 2000	Kathleen Burk	Praetorius	A group of 4 Voltas (from dances from Terpsichore, 1612)	
13 May 2000	Kathleen Burk	Schubert	"Der Leiermann" (from Winterreise)	
13 May 2000	Kathleen Burk	Guillaume de Machaut	"Douce Dame Jolie" (a virelai)	
13 May 2000	Kathleen Burk	John Dunstaple	Gloria in canon	
13 May 2000	Kathleen Burk	William Byrd	"My Sweet Little Darling"	
13 May 2000	Kathleen Burk	W. A. Mozart	"Placido e il mare" (from Idomeneo, act 2)	
13 May 2000	Kathleen Burk	Monteverdi	"Pur ti miro, pur ti godo" (duet from L'incoronazione di Poppea, act 3)	
13 May 2000	Kathleen Burk	Beethoven	Quartet No. 15 in A minor, Op. 132 (excerpt from third movement, "Heilige Dankgesang eines Gesenden an die Gottheit, in der Lydische Tonart")	
13 May 2000	Kathleen Burk	Beethoven	"Mir ist so wunderbar" (from Fidelio, act 1)	
13 May 2000	Kathleen Burk	Monteverdi	"Duo seraphim" (No. 7 from Vespro della Beata Vergine, 1610)	
20 May 2000	Kevin Coates	Donizetti	"Chi mi frena in tal momento" (from Lucia do Lammermoor)	
20 May 2000	Kevin Coates	Handel	"As steals the morn upon the night" (from L'Allegro, il Penseroso ed il Moderato)	
20 May 2000	Kevin Coates	Olivier Messiaen	Intermède (from Quartet for the End of Time)	
20 May 2000	Kevin Coates	W. A. Mozart	"Canzonetta sull'aria" (from Le nozze di Figaro)	
20 May 2000	Kevin Coates	Sergei Prokofiev	Aubade (Mandolin Dance) (from Romeo and Juliet)	
20 May 2000	Kevin Coates	Sarasate	Navarra, Op. 33	
20 May 2000	Kevin Coates	Telemann	Sonata in B♭ (1st movement – Dolce et vivace)	
20 May 2000	Kevin Coates	Traditional music	Raga Jogeshwari (beginning of Alap)	
20 May 2000	Kevin Coates	Vivaldi	"Agitata da due venti" (from Griselda)	
27 May 2000	Richard Sennett	Bach	Arioso (from Cantata 156)	
27 May 2000	Richard Sennett	Gabriel Fauré	Cello Sonata No. 2, Op. 117 (1st movement – allegro)	
27 May 2000	Richard Sennett	Irving Berlin	"Count Your Blessings (Instead of Sheep)"	
27 May 2000	Richard Sennett	Schubert	Impromptu in G♭, D.899/3	
27 May 2000	Richard Sennett	Brahms	Intermezzo in B minor, Op. 119/1	
27 May 2000	Richard Sennett	Domenico Scarlatti	Sonata in C♯ minor, Kk. 247	
27 May 2000	Richard Sennett	Traditional music	"Swing Low, Sweet Chariot"	
27 May 2000	Richard Sennett	Blas de Laserna	Tonadilla	
27 May 2000	Richard Sennett	Bach	Air (from Orchestral Suite No. 3)	
3 Jun 2000	Karen Armstrong	Bach	Gigue (from Suite No. 5 in C minor, BWV 1011)	
3 Jun 2000	Karen Armstrong	Beethoven	Quartet No. 15 in A minor, Op. 132 (excerpt from third movement, Heilige Dankgesang eines Gesenden an die Gottheit, in der Lydische Tonart)	
3 Jun 2000	Karen Armstrong	Bob Dylan	"Visions of Johanna" (from Blonde on Blonde)	
3 Jun 2000	Karen Armstrong	Gregorian Chant	"Christus factus est" (Gradual for Palm Sunday)	
3 Jun 2000	Karen Armstrong	W. A. Mozart	Larghetto from Clarinet Quintet, K. 581	
3 Jun 2000	Karen Armstrong	Henry Purcell	"Thy hand, Belinda...When I am laid in earth" (from Dido and Aeneas)	
3 Jun 2000	Karen Armstrong	The Qur'an	Surat al-Qadr	
10 Jun 2000	Jonathan Keates	Berlioz	"L'île inconnue" (from Les Nuits d'été)	
10 Jun 2000	Jonathan Keates	Donizetti	"La sacrilega parola" (from Poliuto)	
10 Jun 2000	Jonathan Keates	Antonín Dvořák	Symphony No. 3 in E♭, Op. 10 (2nd movement – adagio molto – conclusion)	
10 Jun 2000	Jonathan Keates	Elgar	Symphony No. 1 in A♭, Op. 55 (4th movement – conclusion)	
10 Jun 2000	Jonathan Keates	Handel	"As with rosy steps the morn" (from Theodora)	
10 Jun 2000	Jonathan Keates	Haydn	Armida – Overture	
10 Jun 2000	Jonathan Keates	Henry Purcell	"O all ye people, clap your hands"	
10 Jun 2000	Jonathan Keates	Henri Salvador and Bernard Dimey	"Syracuse"	
17 Jun 2000	Julia Somerville	Verdi	"Ah! Dite alla giovine" (from La traviata, act 2, scene 1)	
17 Jun 2000	Julia Somerville	Cole Porter	"It's All Right with Me"	
17 Jun 2000	Julia Somerville	Bach	Prelude (from Suite No. 1 in G, BWV 1007)	
17 Jun 2000	Julia Somerville	Beethoven	Quartet in B♭, Op. 18/6 (opening of 4th movement – Adagio "La Malinconia")	
17 Jun 2000	Julia Somerville	Abel Meeropol	"Strange Fruit"	
17 Jun 2000	Julia Somerville	Richard Strauss	Trio (from Der Rosenkavalier, act 3)	
17 Jun 2000	Julia Somerville	Bach	"Erbarme dich" (from St Matthew Passion)	
17 Jun 2000	Julia Somerville	Schubert	Quintet in C, D.956 (opening of 2nd movement)	
24 Jun 2000	Robert Temple	Bach	Fugue in C (from The Well-Tempered Clavier, book 1)	
24 Jun 2000	Robert Temple	Bonga	"Mona ki ngi Xiça"	
24 Jun 2000	Robert Temple	César Franck	Prelude (from Prelude, Fugue and Variation, Op. 18)	
24 Jun 2000	Robert Temple	Ernesto Lecuona	Rapsodia Cubana	
24 Jun 2000	Robert Temple	Marin Marais	"La Rêveuse" (from 4th book of Pieces for the Viola da Gamba)	
24 Jun 2000	Robert Temple	N/A	Wolves howling	
24 Jun 2000	Robert Temple	Camille Saint-Saëns	Symphony No. 3 in C minor (2nd movement – Poco Adagio)	
24 Jun 2000	Robert Temple	Alexander Scriabin	Study in D♯ minor, Op. 8/12	
24 Jun 2000	Robert Temple	Tartini	Cello Concerto in D (2nd movement – Grave)	
1 Jul 2000	Laurence Marks	Bach	"Zion hört die Wächter" (from Cantata 140)	
1 Jul 2000	Laurence Marks	Beethoven	Symphony No. 6 in F, Op. 68 – Pastoral (1st movement – Allegro ma non troppo)	
1 Jul 2000	Laurence Marks	John Ireland	Elegy (from A Downland Suite) (pub. John Ireland Trust)	
1 Jul 2000	Laurence Marks	Jimmy Rowles	"The Peacocks" (pub. Kudu Music/BMI)	
1 Jul 2000	Laurence Marks	Alessandro Marcello	Oboe Concerto in D minor (2nd movement – Adagio)	
1 Jul 2000	Laurence Marks	Paul Desmond	"Take Five"	
8 Jul 2000	Ronald Rae	Bach	Prelude and Fugue in E, BWV 878 (The Well-Tempered Clavier, book 2)	
8 Jul 2000	Ronald Rae	Schubert	Sonata in B♭, D960 (2nd movement, Andante sostenuto)	
8 Jul 2000	Ronald Rae	Shostakovich	Fugue No. 24 in D minor (24 Preludes and Fugues)	
8 Jul 2000	Ronald Rae	Shostakovich	Quartet No. 9 (last movement, Allegro)	
8 Jul 2000	Ronald Rae	Jean Sibelius	Tapiola, Op. 112	
8 Jul 2000	Ronald Rae	Ralph Vaughan Williams	Flos Campi (last part, Moderato tranquillo)	
8 Jul 2000	Ronald Rae	Peter Warlock	Capriol Suite (2nd movement, Pavane)	
15 Jul 2000	Kyra Vayne	Richard Strauss	Die Fledermaus – overture	
15 Jul 2000	Kyra Vayne	Shostakovich	Foxtrot (from Jazz Suite No.1)	
15 Jul 2000	Kyra Vayne	Domenico Scarlatti	Sonata in G minor, Kk. 30 (Cat's Fugue)	
15 Jul 2000	Kyra Vayne	Chopin	Polonaise in A, Op. 40/1	
15 Jul 2000	Kyra Vayne	Mahler	"Wenn dein Mütterlein" (from Kindertotenlieder)	
15 Jul 2000	Kyra Vayne	Pietro Mascagni	"Voi lo sapete" (from Cavalliera Rusticana)	
15 Jul 2000	Kyra Vayne	Jules Massenet	Élégie	
15 Jul 2000	Kyra Vayne	Verdi	"Ernani involami" (from Ernani)	
22 Jul 2000	Sir Frank Kermode	Alexander Goehr	"Sing, Ariel" (conclusion)	
22 Jul 2000	Sir Frank Kermode	Bach	Ach Herr, lehre uns (from Gottes Zeit ist die allerbeste Zeit, BWV 106)	
22 Jul 2000	Sir Frank Kermode	Beethoven	Quartet in B♭, Op. 18/6 (4th movement)	
22 Jul 2000	Sir Frank Kermode	Britten	Variation V & Scene 6: The Lesson (from The Turn of the Screw)	
22 Jul 2000	Sir Frank Kermode	Handel	"Io t'abbraccio" (from Rodelinda)	
22 Jul 2000	Sir Frank Kermode	W. A. Mozart	"Per pieta, ben mio" (from Così fan tutte)	
29 Jul 2000	Elaine Feinstein	Bach	"Singet dem Herrn" (excerpt from motet No. 1)	
29 Jul 2000	Elaine Feinstein	Bertolt Brecht and Hanns Eisler	"Ballad of the Waterwheel"	
29 Jul 2000	Elaine Feinstein	Chopin	Nocturne in E, op. 62/2	
29 Jul 2000	Elaine Feinstein	C. P. E. Bach	Concerto in A (slow movement)	
29 Jul 2000	Elaine Feinstein	Georges Brassens	"Marinette"	
29 Jul 2000	Elaine Feinstein	King Oliver	"West End Blues" (rec. Chicago, 28 June 1928)	
29 Jul 2000	Elaine Feinstein	W. A. Mozart	The Marriage of Figaro (act 3, "Dove sono i bei momenti")	
29 Jul 2000	Elaine Feinstein	N/A	Elaine Feinstein reads from Gold	
29 Jul 2000	Elaine Feinstein	Shostakovich	From Jewish Folk Poetry, Op. 79 (Lullaby)	
29 Jul 2000	Elaine Feinstein	Telemann	Concerto in E minor (last movement, Presto)	
29 Jul 2000	Elaine Feinstein	Verdi	Falstaff (final fugue from act 3, "All the world's a prank")	
5 Aug 2000	Leo Schofield	Amanda McBroom	"Ship in a Bottle"	
5 Aug 2000	Leo Schofield	Bruckner	Symphony No. 7, Adagio (recapitulation only)	
5 Aug 2000	Leo Schofield	Claude Debussy	"Dialogue du vent et de la mer" (finale from La mer)	
5 Aug 2000	Leo Schofield	W. A. Mozart	"Come scoglio" (from Così fan tutte, act 1, scene 3)	
5 Aug 2000	Leo Schofield	Arthur Sullivan	"If you'll give me your attention" (from Princess Ida, act 1)	
5 Aug 2000	Leo Schofield	Verdi	"O don fatale" (Princess Eboli's aria from Don Carlos, act 4, scene 1)	
5 Aug 2000	Leo Schofield	Wagner	"Dich, teure Halle, grüss' ich wieder" (Elisabeth's greeting, from Tannhäuser, act 2, scene 1	
12 Aug 2000	Simon Shorvon	Bach	"Schlummert ein" (from cantata "Ich habe genug", BWV 82)	
12 Aug 2000	Simon Shorvon	Alban Berg	Lulu	
12 Aug 2000	Simon Shorvon	Elliott Carter	String Quartet No. 5 (10th section, Adagio serena)	
12 Aug 2000	Simon Shorvon	Galina Ustvolskaya	Sonata No. 2 (first movement)	
12 Aug 2000	Simon Shorvon	John Coltrane	Ascension Part 1 (Edition 2)	
12 Aug 2000	Simon Shorvon	Sergei Prokofiev	The king with grey eyes (from 5 Poems by Anna Akhmatova)	
12 Aug 2000	Simon Shorvon	Shostakovich	String Quartet No. 15 (second movement, Serenata)	
12 Aug 2000	Simon Shorvon	Sofia Gubaidulina	Concerto for bassoon (second movement)	
19 Aug 2000	Ronald Blythe	Bach	Variation 12 (Canone alla Quarta) from the Goldberg Variations	
19 Aug 2000	Ronald Blythe	Britten	"God moves in a mysterious way" (St Nicholas)	
19 Aug 2000	Ronald Blythe	George Butterworth	"Is My Team Ploughing" (from A Shropshire Lad)	
19 Aug 2000	Ronald Blythe	Cole Porter	"Begin the Beguine"	
19 Aug 2000	Ronald Blythe	Duparc	"L'invitation au voyage" (Baudelaire)	
19 Aug 2000	Ronald Blythe	N/A	Ronald Blythe reads from "First Friends"	
19 Aug 2000	Ronald Blythe	Peter Paul Nash	Et je joue No. 11 "Apollinaire Choruses"	
19 Aug 2000	Ronald Blythe	Schubert	Quintet for piano and strings in A major, D667 (The Trout)	
19 Aug 2000	Ronald Blythe	Thomas Tallis	"If ye love me"	
19 Aug 2000	Ronald Blythe	Michael Tippett	Fantasia Concertante on a Theme of Corelli	
26 Aug 2000	Posy Simmonds	Bach	Prelude and Fugue in G minor, BWV 558	
26 Aug 2000	Posy Simmonds	Brahms	Clarinet Quintet (1st movement, recap only)	
26 Aug 2000	Posy Simmonds	Georges Brassens	"Les sabots d'Hélène"	
26 Aug 2000	Posy Simmonds	Handel	Concerto grosso in B♭, Op. 3, No. 1 (first movement)	
26 Aug 2000	Posy Simmonds	Haydn	Piano Sonata in E minor, Hob XVI 34	
26 Aug 2000	Posy Simmonds	Hilda Paredes	Permutaciones	
26 Aug 2000	Posy Simmonds	W. A. Mozart	"Dove sono" (from The Marriage of Figaro, act 3)	
26 Aug 2000	Posy Simmonds	Schubert	Piano Sonata in G major, D894	
26 Aug 2000	Posy Simmonds	Trad. arr. Ry Cooder	Cancion mixteca (from the soundtrack of Paris, Texas)	
2 Sep 2000	Richard Cork	Adam Cork	Interlude from "Colonel Bird"	
2 Sep 2000	Richard Cork	Beethoven	Symphony No. 7 (finale)	
2 Sep 2000	Richard Cork	Britten	"Move him into the sun" (from War Requiem)	
2 Sep 2000	Richard Cork	W. A. Mozart	Lacrimosa (Requiem K. 626)	
2 Sep 2000	Richard Cork	Michael Nyman	"Coupling" (from The Cook, the Thief, His Wife & Her Lover)	
2 Sep 2000	Richard Cork	Paul Simon	"Bridge over Troubled Water"	
2 Sep 2000	Richard Cork	Verdi	Lacrymosa (Messa da Requiem)	
2 Sep 2000	Richard Cork	Kurt Weill	"Alabama Song" (from Mahagonny-Songspiel)	
9 Sep 2000	Asa Briggs	W. A. Mozart	Così fan tutte (conclusion of act 1)	
9 Sep 2000	Asa Briggs	Richard Strauss	Don Quixote, Op. 35 (Theme and variations 1 and 2)	
9 Sep 2000	Asa Briggs	Bach	Italian Concerto, BWV 971 (1st movement)	
9 Sep 2000	Asa Briggs	Brahms	Symphony No. 2 in D, Op. 73 (3rd movement – Allegretto grazioso)	
9 Sep 2000	Asa Briggs	Britten	"Now the Great Bear and Pleiades" (from Peter Grimes)	
9 Sep 2000	Asa Briggs	Chopin	Waltz in D♭, Op. 64/1 – "Minute Waltz" (opening)	
9 Sep 2000	Asa Briggs	Domenico Scarlatti	Sonata in A, Kk. 24	
9 Sep 2000	Asa Briggs	Domenico Scarlatti	Sonata in C, Kk. 309	
9 Sep 2000	Asa Briggs	Schubert	Erlkönig, D.328	
16 Sep 2000	Eva Figes	Bach	Double Concerto in D minor, BWV 1043 (2nd movement -Largo ma non tanto)	
16 Sep 2000	Eva Figes	Beethoven	Quartet in B♭, Op. 130 (5th movement – Cavatina)	
16 Sep 2000	Eva Figes	Eva Figes	"The Knot"	
16 Sep 2000	Eva Figes	Haydn	Von deiner Güt', o Herr und Gott (from Die Schöpfung)	
16 Sep 2000	Eva Figes	F. W. Meacham and Jerry Gray	"American Patrol"	
16 Sep 2000	Eva Figes	Schubert	"Der Lindenbaum" (from Winterreise)	
16 Sep 2000	Eva Figes	Schubert	Impromptu in G♭, D. 899/3	
16 Sep 2000	Eva Figes	Kurt Weill	"Pirate Jenny" (from The Threepenny Opera)	
23 Sep 2000	Christopher Potter	Schubert	"Der Leiermann" (from Winterreise)	
23 Sep 2000	Christopher Potter	Richard Strauss	Gesang der Apollopriesterin, Op. 33/2	
23 Sep 2000	Christopher Potter	Sibelius	"Var det en Dröm"	
23 Sep 2000	Christopher Potter	Forman Brown	The Yashmak Song	
23 Sep 2000	Christopher Potter	György Ligeti	Piet recognises Nekrotzar as Death (from Le Grand Macabre)	
23 Sep 2000	Christopher Potter	W. A. Mozart	Che vedesse il mio dolore + Che del ciel, che degli Dei (from La Clemenza di Tito)	
23 Sep 2000	Christopher Potter	Eileen Newton and Arthur Tate	"Somewhere a Voice Is Calling"	
23 Sep 2000	Christopher Potter	Jacques Offenbach	Ah! quel diner (from La Périchole)	
23 Sep 2000	Christopher Potter	Wagner	Waltraute's meeting with Brünnhilde (from Götterdämmerung)	
30 Sep 2000	George Benjamin	Bach	"Herr, unser Herrscher" (last 1/3 of 1st chorus from the St John Passion)	
30 Sep 2000	George Benjamin	Beethoven	Symphony No. 7 in A, Op. 92 (end of finale)	
30 Sep 2000	George Benjamin	Alban Berg	"Seele, wie bist du schöne" (No. 1 from Altenberglieder, Op. 4)	
30 Sep 2000	George Benjamin	Berlioz	Queen Mab Scherzo (final section only from Romeo and Juliet, Op. 17)	
30 Sep 2000	George Benjamin	Traditional Music of Myanmar	Hnin thon tha hé min (Season of mists)	Album: Birmanie Musique D'Art
30 Sep 2000	George Benjamin	Debussy	Pelléas et Mélisande (act 1, scene 3)	
30 Sep 2000	George Benjamin	Grisey	Modulations	
30 Sep 2000	George Benjamin	Knussen	Fantastico (Winter's Foil) (No. 1 from Songs Without Voices, Op. 26)	
30 Sep 2000	George Benjamin	Ligeti	Piano Concerto, fourth movement	
30 Sep 2000	George Benjamin	Olivier Messiaen	L'épouse (no. 5 from Poèmes pour Mi)	
30 Sep 2000	George Benjamin	Henry Purcell	Fantazia 7 in C minor	
7 Oct 2000	Dr. David Cohen	Bach	Magnificat (opening chorus)	
7 Oct 2000	Dr. David Cohen	Beethoven	Variations on "God Save the King"	
7 Oct 2000	Dr. David Cohen	Berio	"In ruhig fliessender Bewegung" (excerpt from 3rd movement of Sinfonia)	
7 Oct 2000	Dr. David Cohen	Berlioz	Trojan March (Finale from act 1 of Les Troyens)	
7 Oct 2000	Dr. David Cohen	Schubert	Fantasy in C major, D 934	
7 Oct 2000	Dr. David Cohen	Sibelius	String Quartet in D minor, Op. 56, Voces intimae (first movement)	
7 Oct 2000	Dr. David Cohen	Stravinsky	Vivo (from Pulcinella)	
7 Oct 2000	Dr. David Cohen	Traditional music	"Brigg Fair"	
7 Oct 2000	Dr. David Cohen	Traditional music	The 7.40 Train	
14 Oct 2000	Robyn Davidson	Bob Dylan	"Love Sick"	
14 Oct 2000	Robyn Davidson	Chopin	Nocturne in E♭, Op. 55/2	
14 Oct 2000	Robyn Davidson	Traditional Australian	Inma Ngintaka	
14 Oct 2000	Robyn Davidson	Bach	Dona Nobis Pacem" (from Mass in B minor, BWV 232)	
14 Oct 2000	Robyn Davidson	Berlioz	La Belle Voyageuse, Op. 2/4	
14 Oct 2000	Robyn Davidson	Traditional Indian	Raga Kambohji	
14 Oct 2000	Robyn Davidson	Ligeti	Chamber concerto (4th movement – Presto)	
14 Oct 2000	Robyn Davidson	Mahler	"Ich Bin der Welt abhanden gekommen" (from Rückert-Lieder)	
14 Oct 2000	Robyn Davidson	Mompou	Cançon i Danse No. 6	
14 Oct 2000	Robyn Davidson	Domenico Scarlatti	Sonata in C, Kk. 159	
21 Oct 2000	Dave Liebman	Dave Liebman	Storm Surge (The Elements: Water)	
21 Oct 2000	Dave Liebman	Earth Wind Fire and X	"That's the Way of the World"	
21 Oct 2000	Dave Liebman	Charles Ives	The Unanswered Question	
21 Oct 2000	Dave Liebman	John Coltrane	"Crescent"	
21 Oct 2000	Dave Liebman	Joni Mitchell	"Woodstock"	
21 Oct 2000	Dave Liebman	Miles Davis and Gil Evans	"The Pan Piper" from Sketches of Spain	
21 Oct 2000	Dave Liebman	Trad. arr. Gasparian	"A Cool Wind Is Blowing"	
28 Oct 2000	Bryan Magee	Wagner	Höchstes Vertraun (from Lohengrin)	
28 Oct 2000	Bryan Magee	W. A. Mozart	Piano Concerto in C, K. 467 (2nd movement – Andante)	
28 Oct 2000	Bryan Magee	Richard Strauss	"September" (from Four Last Songs)	
28 Oct 2000	Bryan Magee	Elgar	Serenade for Strings, Op. 20 (2nd movement – Larghetto)	
28 Oct 2000	Bryan Magee	Guy Wood and Robert Mellin	My one and only love	
28 Oct 2000	Bryan Magee	Mahler and Deryck Cooke	Symphony No.10 (Finale – 2 excerpts)	
28 Oct 2000	Bryan Magee	W. A. Mozart	Farewell Quintet (from Così fan tutte, act 1)	
28 Oct 2000	Bryan Magee	Sibelius	Symphony No. 4 in A minor, Op. 63 (2nd movement – Allegro molto vivace)	
4 Nov 2000	Jacqueline Mina	Bach	Sarabande (from Suite in G minor, BWV 1011) arr.: North	
4 Nov 2000	Jacqueline Mina	Béla Bartók	Contrasts (3rd movement – Sebes [fast dance])	
4 Nov 2000	Jacqueline Mina	Britten	"I know a Bank" (from A Midsummer Night's Dream)	
4 Nov 2000	Jacqueline Mina	Lew Brown and Ray Henderson	"The Thrill is Gone"	
4 Nov 2000	Jacqueline Mina	Walter Bullock and Richard A. Whiting	"When did you leave Heaven?"	
4 Nov 2000	Jacqueline Mina	Traditional Greek	Melody of the "Teke" in minor scale	
4 Nov 2000	Jacqueline Mina	Henry Purcell	"I attempt from love's sickness to fly"	
4 Nov 2000	Jacqueline Mina	Ravel	Introduction and Allegro	
4 Nov 2000	Jacqueline Mina	Ralph Vaughan Williams	"Linden Lea"	
11 Nov 2000	Helen Simpson	Brahms	Sextet No.1 in B♭, Op. 18 (opening of 2nd movement – Andante ma moderato)	
11 Nov 2000	Helen Simpson	Thomas Campion	"Come, cheerful day"	
11 Nov 2000	Helen Simpson	Debussy	"De l'aube à midi sur la mer" (conclusion) (from La Mer)	
11 Nov 2000	Helen Simpson	Gluck	"Viens, suis un époux qui t'adore" (from Orphée et Euridice)	
11 Nov 2000	Helen Simpson	Mike Westbrook	"Utopia Blues" (excerpt)	
11 Nov 2000	Helen Simpson	Marguerite Monnot and Claude Délècluse and Michelle Senlis	"Les Amants d'un Jour"	
11 Nov 2000	Helen Simpson	W. A. Mozart	Fantasia in C minor, K. 475 (1st section – Adagio)	
11 Nov 2000	Helen Simpson	Pelham Humfrey	"Oh! that I had but a Fine man"	
11 Nov 2000	Helen Simpson	Henry Purcell	Drum processional and March (from Music for the Funeral of Queen Mary)	
11 Nov 2000	Helen Simpson	Ravel	Deux robinets coulent (from L'Enfant et les Sortilèges)	
18 Nov 2000	Norman Rosenthal	George Benjamin	A Mind of Winter (conclusion)	
18 Nov 2000	Norman Rosenthal	Boulez	Improvisation I – sur Mallarmé (from Pli selon Pli)	
18 Nov 2000	Norman Rosenthal	John Cage	Europera 3 (conclusion)	
18 Nov 2000	Norman Rosenthal	Hans Werner Henze	"Das Paradies" (from Six Songs from the Arabian)	
18 Nov 2000	Norman Rosenthal	Olivier Messiaen	Noël (from Vingt Regards sur l'Enfant-Jésus)	
18 Nov 2000	Norman Rosenthal	Arnold Schoenberg	Herzgewächse, Op. 20	
18 Nov 2000	Norman Rosenthal	Stravinsky	Ivresse matinale (from Perséphone)	
18 Nov 2000	Norman Rosenthal	Kurt Weill	"Life, Love, and Laughter" (from The Firebrand of Florence)	
18 Nov 2000	Norman Rosenthal	Wolf-Ferrari	"Aprile o bella" (from The Jewels of the Madonna)	
25 Nov 2000	Rick Stein	Malcolm Arnold	The Padstow Lifeboat, Op. 94	
25 Nov 2000	Rick Stein	Aaron Copland	"Saturday Night Waltz" (from Rodeo)	
25 Nov 2000	Rick Stein	Handel	"I know that my Redeemer liveth" (from Messiah)	
25 Nov 2000	Rick Stein	John Lee Hooker	"This is Hip"	
25 Nov 2000	Rick Stein	Felix Mendelssohn	Symphony No. 4 in A, Op.90 – "Italian" (4th movement – Saltarello. Presto)	
25 Nov 2000	Rick Stein	W. A. Mozart	Concerto in C for Flute and Harp, K. 299 (opening of 2nd movement – Andantino)	
25 Nov 2000	Rick Stein	Pura Fe	Mahk Jchi	
25 Nov 2000	Rick Stein	Thomas Wyatt	"They flee from Me"	
25 Nov 2000	Rick Stein	Verdi	"Parigi, o cara, noi lasceremo" (from La traviata)	
2 Dec 2000	Maxwell Hutchinson	Albert King	"Laundromat Blues"	
2 Dec 2000	Maxwell Hutchinson	Antoine Forqueray	La Forqeray	
2 Dec 2000	Maxwell Hutchinson	Brahms	"Alto Rhapsody"	
2 Dec 2000	Maxwell Hutchinson	Elgar	"O Salutaris"	
2 Dec 2000	Maxwell Hutchinson	Gabriel Fauré	Cantique de Jean Racine	
2 Dec 2000	Maxwell Hutchinson	César Franck	Prelude, Fugue and Variation	
2 Dec 2000	Maxwell Hutchinson	John Coltrane	"Giant Steps"	
2 Dec 2000	Maxwell Hutchinson	Martin Codax	"Mandad'ei comingo" (Cantigas de Amigo)	
2 Dec 2000	Maxwell Hutchinson	Ralph Vaughan Williams	"Down Ampney" ("Come Down, O Love Divine")	
9 Dec 2000	Canon Tom Wright	Beethoven	Symphony No. 9 in D minor, Op. 125 "Choral" (end of 4th movement)	
9 Dec 2000	Canon Tom Wright	Bob Dylan	"When the Ship Comes In"	
9 Dec 2000	Canon Tom Wright	Handel	"Comfort ye" (from Messiah)	
9 Dec 2000	Canon Tom Wright	Original Dixieland Jazz Band	"Livery Stable Blues"	
9 Dec 2000	Canon Tom Wright	Schubert	"Gute Nacht" (from Winterreise)	
9 Dec 2000	Canon Tom Wright	Sibelius	Symphony No. 4 in A minor, Op. 63 (2nd movement – allegro molto vivace)	
9 Dec 2000	Canon Tom Wright	Ralph Vaughan Williams	Symphony No. 5 in D (opening of 1st movement)	
9 Dec 2000	Canon Tom Wright	Walford Davies	Psalm 23	
16 Dec 2000	Patrick Gale	Bach	Suite No. 3 in C, BWV 1009 (1st movement – Prelude)	
16 Dec 2000	Patrick Gale	Britten	"From the Gutter" (from Peter Grimes)	
16 Dec 2000	Patrick Gale	Handel	"Dominus a dextris tuis" (from Dixit Dominus)	
16 Dec 2000	Patrick Gale	Felix Mendelssohn	Octet in E♭, Op. 20 (4th movement – Presto)	
16 Dec 2000	Patrick Gale	Felix Mendelssohn	Song without Words in E, Op. 19/1	
16 Dec 2000	Patrick Gale	Olivier Messiaen	O sacrum convivium!	
16 Dec 2000	Patrick Gale	Michael Tippett	"Dance, Clarion Air"	
16 Dec 2000	Patrick Gale	Trad. arr. Britten	"O Waly, Waly"	
23 Dec 2000	National Theatre of Brent	Addinsell	Warsaw Concerto (opening)	
23 Dec 2000	National Theatre of Brent	Béla Bartók	Music for Strings, Percussion and Celesta (opening of 2nd movement)	
23 Dec 2000	National Theatre of Brent	Elmer Bernstein	Prelude (from The Ten Commandments)	
23 Dec 2000	National Theatre of Brent	Handel	Hallelujah Chorus (from Messiah)	
23 Dec 2000	National Theatre of Brent	Giya Kancheli	...à la Duduki (opening)	
23 Dec 2000	National Theatre of Brent	Bill Martin and Phil Coulter	"Congratulations"	
23 Dec 2000	National Theatre of Brent	Philip Glass	"The Funeral of Amenhotep III" (from Akhnaten)	
23 Dec 2000	National Theatre of Brent	Wagner	"Ride of the Valkyries" (from Die Walküre)	
30 Dec 2000	Robert Skidelsky	Mussorgsky	Boris' Monologue (from Boris Godunov)	
30 Dec 2000	Robert Skidelsky	Verdi	Ingemisco (from Messa da Requiem)	
30 Dec 2000	Robert Skidelsky	Anonymous work	"Pray my Kinsman"	
30 Dec 2000	Robert Skidelsky	Donizetti	"Anna Bolena"	
30 Dec 2000	Robert Skidelsky	Liszt	Sonata in B minor	
30 Dec 2000	Robert Skidelsky	W. A. Mozart	"Laudate Dominum" (from Vesperae solennes de confessore, K. 339)	
30 Dec 2000	Robert Skidelsky	W. A. Mozart	Sinfonia Concertante in E♭, K. 364	

== 2001 ==
Date	Guest	Composer	Title	Performer / Label
6 Jan 2001	A C Grayling	Bach	"Ich habe genug" (first aria from the cantata, BWV 82)	
6 Jan 2001	A C Grayling	Beethoven	Choral Fantasy, Op. 80 (Last movement – Allegro)	
6 Jan 2001	A C Grayling	Brahms	Feldeinsamkeit, Op. 86/2	
6 Jan 2001	A C Grayling	Debussy	Sonata for flute, viola and harp (2nd movement – Interlude)	
6 Jan 2001	A C Grayling	Haydn	Quartet in B minor, Op. 33/1 (Finale – presto)	
6 Jan 2001	A C Grayling	Puccini	Un bel di (from Madama Butterfly)	
6 Jan 2001	A C Grayling	Reynaldo Hahn	L'heure exquise	
6 Jan 2001	A C Grayling	Schubert	Moment Musical in C♯ minor, D. 780/4	
13 Jan 2001	Sir Michael Levey	Vincenzo Bellini	"Angiol di pace" (from Beatrice di Tenda)	
13 Jan 2001	Sir Michael Levey	Handel	"See in spate the high cataract storming" (from Julius Caesar)	
13 Jan 2001	Sir Michael Levey	John Lennon and Paul McCartney	"When I'm Sixty-Four"	
13 Jan 2001	Sir Michael Levey	W. A. Mozart	Chorus and entrance of Sarastro (from The Magic Flute, act 1)	
13 Jan 2001	Sir Michael Levey	Puccini	"Gratias agimus tibi" (from Messa di Gloria)	
13 Jan 2001	Sir Michael Levey	Richard Strauss	Die Frau ohne Schatten (conclusion of act 3)	
13 Jan 2001	Sir Michael Levey	Tchaikovsky	Symphony No. 1 in G minor "Winter Daydreams" (opening of 1st movement)	
13 Jan 2001	Sir Michael Levey	Carl Maria von Weber	Oberon (conclusion of act 1)	
20 Jan 2001	Robert Harbison	Vincenzo Bellini	"Casta Diva" (from Norma)	
20 Jan 2001	Robert Harbison	Chopin	Nocturne in E♭, Op. 55/2	
20 Jan 2001	Robert Harbison	Handel	"Col saggio tuo consiglio" (from Agrippina)	
20 Jan 2001	Robert Harbison	W. A. Mozart	Opening of act 1, finale (from Così fan tutte)	
20 Jan 2001	Robert Harbison	Buck Ram and Ande Rand	"Only You (And You Alone)"	
20 Jan 2001	Robert Harbison	Schubert	Sei mir gegrüsst, D.741	
20 Jan 2001	Robert Harbison	Alessandro Stradella	Su coronatemi + Chi nel comun gioire (from San Giovanni Battista)	
3 Feb 2001	Bob Willis	Bob Dylan	"Forever Young"	
3 Feb 2001	Bob Willis	Mahler	Symphony No. 4 in G (4th movement – Sehr behaglich)	
3 Feb 2001	Bob Willis	Van Morrison	"Queen of the Slipstream"	
3 Feb 2001	Bob Willis	Shostakovich	Symphony No. 8 in C minor, Op. 65 (3rd movement – Allegro non troppo)	
3 Feb 2001	Bob Willis	Wagner	The Rhinegold (opening)	
3 Feb 2001	Bob Willis	Wagner	Twilight of the Gods	
10 Feb 2001	Colin Thubron	Francesco Cavalli	Non È Crudel + Amara Servitù (from La Calisto)	
10 Feb 2001	Colin Thubron	Umberto Giordano	Un Di, All'Azzuro Spazio (from Andrea Chenier)	
10 Feb 2001	Colin Thubron	Leoš Janáček	Kostelnicka's Aria (from Jenůfa, act 2)	
10 Feb 2001	Colin Thubron	Mahler	"Der Abschied" (conclusion) (from Das Lied von der Erde)	
10 Feb 2001	Colin Thubron	Mussorgsky	"The Winds Are Howling"	
10 Feb 2001	Colin Thubron	Traditional Peruvian	"Espiritu Inka"	
10 Feb 2001	Colin Thubron	Puccini	"Or Son Sai Mesi" (Conclusion) (from La Fanciulla Del West)	
10 Feb 2001	Colin Thubron	Richard Strauss	Morgen, Op. 27/4	
10 Feb 2001	Colin Thubron	Schubert	"Die Nebensonnen" (from Winterreise)	
10 Feb 2001	Colin Thubron	Traditional music	Ecstatic Dances of The Whirling Dervishes	
17 Feb 2001	Keith Sutton (?)	J. S. Bach, arranged by Ferruccio Busoni	"Nun komm, der Heiden Heiland", BWV 659	
17 Feb 2001	Keith Sutton (?)	Beethoven	Symphony No. 6 in F, Op. 68 – "Pastoral" (Storm and Opening of Shepherds' Hymn)	
17 Feb 2001	Keith Sutton (?)	Beethoven	Trio in B♭, Op. 97 – "Archduke" (opening of 3rd movement – Andante Cantabile)	
17 Feb 2001	Keith Sutton (?)	Britten	"The Choirmaster's Burial" (from Winter Words, Op. 52)	
17 Feb 2001	Keith Sutton (?)	Elgar	Cockaigne Overture, Op. 40 (Conclusion)	
17 Feb 2001	Keith Sutton (?)	Michael Tippett	"Nunc Dimittis"	
17 Feb 2001	Keith Sutton (?)	Traditional music	"Nkosi Sikeleli Afrika"	
17 Feb 2001	Keith Sutton (?)	Wilbye	"Draw On, Sweet Night"	
24 Feb 2001	Jennifer Johnston	Cole Porter	"Miss Otis Regrets"	
24 Feb 2001	Jennifer Johnston	Roger Edens, Betty Comden and Adolph Green	"Moses" (from Singin' in the Rain)	
24 Feb 2001	Jennifer Johnston	Elgar	Cello Concerto in E minor, Op. 85 (1st movement – Adagio – Moderato)	
24 Feb 2001	Jennifer Johnston	Irving Berlin	"Let's Face the Music and Dance"	
24 Feb 2001	Jennifer Johnston	W. A. Mozart	Introitus (from Requiem Mass, K. 626)	
24 Feb 2001	Jennifer Johnston	Schubert	Der Hirt Auf Dem Felsen, D. 965	
24 Feb 2001	Jennifer Johnston	Norbert Schultze and Hans Leip and Tommy Connor and Jimmy Phillips	"Lili Marlene"	
24 Feb 2001	Jennifer Johnston	Traditional music	"The Beatitudes"	
3 Mar 2001	Hugh Brody	Bach	Violin Concerto in A minor, BWV 1041 (3rd movement – Allegro Assai)	
3 Mar 2001	Hugh Brody	Beethoven	Cello Sonata in F, Op. 5/1 (opening of 2nd movement – Allegro)	
3 Mar 2001	Hugh Brody	Bizet	Habañera (from Carmen)	
3 Mar 2001	Hugh Brody	Tom Lehrer	Lobachevsky	
3 Mar 2001	Hugh Brody	Leonard Cohen	"Suzanne"	
3 Mar 2001	Hugh Brody	W. A. Mozart	Offertorium (from Requiem, K. 626)	
3 Mar 2001	Hugh Brody	Traditional music	Innuit Throat Singing	
3 Mar 2001	Hugh Brody	Traditional music	White Mountain Apache Crown Dance	
3 Mar 2001	Hugh Brody	Beethoven	Piano Sonata in E♭, Op. 81a – "Les Adieux" (2nd & 3rd movements)	
10 Mar 2001	Jacques Loussier	Bach	"Air on a G String"	
10 Mar 2001	Jacques Loussier	Debussy	"L'Isle Joyeuse"	
10 Mar 2001	Jacques Loussier	Erroll Garner	"That's My Kick"	
10 Mar 2001	Jacques Loussier	Modern Jazz Quartet	"Django"	
10 Mar 2001	Jacques Loussier	Pink Floyd	"Another Brick in The Wall" Part 2 from The Wall	
10 Mar 2001	Jacques Loussier	Ravel	2nd movement from Piano Concerto in G major	
10 Mar 2001	Jacques Loussier	Bach	Aria 'Ich Habe Genug' (from Kantate No. 82)	
17 Mar 2001	John Napper	Bach	"Kommt, Ihr Töchter, Helft Mir Klagen" (Opening Chorus from St Matthew Passion)	
17 Mar 2001	John Napper	Joseph Canteloube	"Down There in the Limousin" (from Songs of the Auvergne)	
17 Mar 2001	John Napper	Ewan MacColl	"Shoals of Herring"	
17 Mar 2001	John Napper	Not Available	Hindi Holi	
17 Mar 2001	John Napper	Not Available	The Lady of Carlisle	
17 Mar 2001	John Napper	Ottorino Respighi	"The Birth of Venus" (from Trittico Botticelliano)	
17 Mar 2001	John Napper	Sibelius	Symphony No. 4 in A, Op. 63 (1st movement excerpt)	
17 Mar 2001	John Napper	The Beatles	"Come Together"	
17 Mar 2001	John Napper	Traditional Spanish arr. Graciano Tarragó	"Jaeneras que yo canto"	
24 Mar 2001	Ruth Fainlight	Anonymous work	Sibil-La Catalane	
24 Mar 2001	Ruth Fainlight	Harrison Birtwistle	Tenebrae (from Pulse Shadows)	
24 Mar 2001	Ruth Fainlight	Olivier Messiaen	"Bonjour toi, colombe verte" and "Katchikatchi les étoiles" (from Harawi)	
24 Mar 2001	Ruth Fainlight	Mostazo and José M. Molleda and Joaquim De La Oliva and Florian Rey	Antonio Vargas Heredia	
24 Mar 2001	Ruth Fainlight	W. A. Mozart	Clarinet Quintet in A, K. 581 (3rd movement – Menuetto)	
24 Mar 2001	Ruth Fainlight	Puccini	"Como tu m'odil" and "Vissi d'arte" (from Tosca, act 2)	
24 Mar 2001	Ruth Fainlight	Traditional music	Qsbah Solo	
24 Mar 2001	Ruth Fainlight	Traditional music	"The Cuckoo"	
24 Mar 2001	Ruth Fainlight	Traditional music	"Ya Da Fik Ghzal"	
31 Mar 2001	Michael Henderson	Beethoven	Quartet in C♯ minor, Op. 131 (1st movement – Adagio ma non troppo)	
31 Mar 2001	Michael Henderson	Leoš Janáček	Jenufa (conclusion)	
31 Mar 2001	Michael Henderson	Mahler	Symphony No. 9 (conclusion of 1st movement)	
31 Mar 2001	Michael Henderson	Schubert	"Des Baches Wiegenlied" (from Die Schöne Müllerin)	
31 Mar 2001	Michael Henderson	Sibelius	Violin Concerto in D minor, Op. 47 (2nd movement – Adagio di molto)	
31 Mar 2001	Michael Henderson	Stephen Sondheim	"The Miller's Son" (from A Little Night Music)	
31 Mar 2001	Michael Henderson	Wagner	Quintet (from Die Meistersinger von Nürnberg, act 3)	
7 Apr 2001	Glyn Moody	Thomas Adès	Asyla (3rd Movement – Ecstasio)	
7 Apr 2001	Glyn Moody	Charles-Valentin Alkan	Grande Sonate – Les Quatre Ages, Op. 33 (1st movement – Vingt Ans – Très Vite)	
7 Apr 2001	Glyn Moody	Bach	Prelude in C, BWV 846 (from The Well-Tempered Clavier, book 1)	
7 Apr 2001	Glyn Moody	Beethoven	March (from Fidelio, act 1)	
7 Apr 2001	Glyn Moody	Miles Davis	"Nuit sur lChamps-Élysées"	
7 Apr 2001	Glyn Moody	W. A. Mozart	A Musical Dice Game, K. 516f (excerpt)	
7 Apr 2001	Glyn Moody	Erik Satie	Vexations	
7 Apr 2001	Glyn Moody	Schubert	Meeres Stille, D. 216	
7 Apr 2001	Glyn Moody	Sibelius	Väinön Virsi, Op. 110 (Opening)	
7 Apr 2001	Glyn Moody	Traditional music	Lashgvash	
14 Apr 2001	Elizabeth Fritsch	Bach	Preludes No. 5 in D major, No. 10 in E minor (from The Well-Tempered Clavier, book 1	
14 Apr 2001	Elizabeth Fritsch	Alban Berg	Liebesode (from Seven Early Songs)	
14 Apr 2001	Elizabeth Fritsch	Britten	This Yonge Child + Balulalow (from A Ceremony Of Carols, Op. 28)	
14 Apr 2001	Elizabeth Fritsch	Bud Powell	"Tempus Fugit"	
14 Apr 2001	Elizabeth Fritsch	Machaut	"Agnus Dei" (from Messe De Nostre Dame)	
14 Apr 2001	Elizabeth Fritsch	Schnittke	Concerto Grosso No. 1 (Opening Of 5th Movement – Rondo Agitato)	
14 Apr 2001	Elizabeth Fritsch	Schubert	Quartettsatz, D. 703	
14 Apr 2001	Elizabeth Fritsch	Robert Schumann	Mondnacht (from Liederkreis, Op. 39)	
14 Apr 2001	Elizabeth Fritsch	Shostakovich	Quartet No. 3 in F, Op. 73 (2nd movement – Moderato Con Moto)	
14 Apr 2001	Elizabeth Fritsch	Tigran Tahmizhan	"A Cool Wind Is Blowing"	
21 Apr 2001	Michael Holroyd	Franz Berwald	Sinfonia Singulière (Scherzo & Final Adagio)	
21 Apr 2001	Michael Holroyd	Burt Bacharach	"Trains and Boats and Planes"	
21 Apr 2001	Michael Holroyd	Sergei Prokofiev	"The Battle on the Ice" (from Alexander Nevsky)	
21 Apr 2001	Michael Holroyd	Henry Purcell	Dido and Aeneas (opening of act 2)	
21 Apr 2001	Michael Holroyd	Arnold Schoenberg	"Verklärte Nacht"	
21 Apr 2001	Michael Holroyd	Robert Schumann	Arlequin (from Carnaval, Op. 9)	
28 Apr 2001	Dr. Ralph Kohn	Bach	"Hat man nicht mit seinen Kindern" (from Coffee Cantata, BWV 211)	
28 Apr 2001	Dr. Ralph Kohn	Beethoven	Adelaïde, Op. 46	
28 Apr 2001	Dr. Ralph Kohn	Elgar	Violin Concerto in B minor, Op. 61 (conclusion of 2nd movement – Andante)	
28 Apr 2001	Dr. Ralph Kohn	Mahler	Der Abschied (Conclusion) (from Das Lied Von Der Erde)	
28 Apr 2001	Dr. Ralph Kohn	W. A. Mozart	"Ein Mädchen oder Weibchen" (from Die Zauberflöte)	
28 Apr 2001	Dr. Ralph Kohn	Ravel	Chanson Hébraïque (from Chants Populaires)	
28 Apr 2001	Dr. Ralph Kohn	Alessandro Stradella	"Pietà Signore"	
28 Apr 2001	Dr. Ralph Kohn	Bach	"Vergnügte Ruh, beliebte Seelenlust" (from the cantata, BWV 170)	
5 May 2001	Neil Tennant	Eva Cassidy	"Over the Rainbow"	
5 May 2001	Neil Tennant	Kraftwerk	"Computer Love"	
5 May 2001	Neil Tennant	Olivier Messiaen	"Oraison" from movement V. "L'eau" in Fête des belles eaux	
5 May 2001	Neil Tennant	Noël Coward and Gertrude Lawrence	"You Were There"	
5 May 2001	Neil Tennant	Francis Poulenc	Sonata for Oboe and Piano (1st movement Elegie)	
5 May 2001	Neil Tennant	Richard Strauss	Metamorphosen	
5 May 2001	Neil Tennant	Shostakovich	Symphony No. 5 (1st movement)	
12 May 2001	Alan Sillitoe	Vincenzo Bellini	"Casta Diva" (from Norma)	
12 May 2001	Alan Sillitoe	Berlioz	Benvenuto Cellini – Overture	
12 May 2001	Alan Sillitoe	Chopin	Prelude in D♭, Op. 28/15	
12 May 2001	Alan Sillitoe	Handel	"Sing Ye to the Lord" (Final Chorus from Israel In Egypt)	
12 May 2001	Alan Sillitoe	Jerome Kern	"Ol' Man River" (from Showboat)	
12 May 2001	Alan Sillitoe	Sergei Prokofiev	"Death of Mercutio" (from Romeo and Juliet)	
12 May 2001	Alan Sillitoe	Shostakovich	The Execution Of Stepan Razin (Opening)	
12 May 2001	Alan Sillitoe	Ralph Vaughan Williams	"Seventeen Come Sunday" (from English Folk Song Suite)	
19 May 2001	Nicholas Fisher (Nick Fisher)	Aaron Jay Kernis	"How God Answers The Soul"	
19 May 2001	Nicholas Fisher (Nick Fisher)	Handel	"He Spake the Word and He Gave Them Hailstones for Rain" (from Israel In Egypt)	
19 May 2001	Nicholas Fisher (Nick Fisher)	Hans Kox	Sempre Notte (from L'Allegria)	
19 May 2001	Nicholas Fisher (Nick Fisher)	John Blow	"A Pastoral Elegy on the Earl of Rochester"	
19 May 2001	Nicholas Fisher (Nick Fisher)	John Joubert	Theme from "Temps Perdu: Variations For String Orchestra"	
19 May 2001	Nicholas Fisher (Nick Fisher)	Louis Grabu	"Injurious Charmer of My Vanquished Heart" (from Rochester's play Valentinian)	
19 May 2001	Nicholas Fisher (Nick Fisher)	Max Reger	Unser Lieben Frauen Traum (Carol – Our Lady's Vision)	
19 May 2001	Nicholas Fisher (Nick Fisher)	Sergei Prokofiev	Dance with Mandolins (act 2, scene 1 from Romeo and Juliet)	
19 May 2001	Nicholas Fisher (Nick Fisher)	Bedřich Smetana	Skocna "Hopping Dance" (from Czech Dances 2 -1879)	
19 May 2001	Nicholas Fisher (Nick Fisher)	Ralph Vaughan Williams	"Bright Is the Ring of Words" (from Songs of Travel)	
26 May 2001	Jenni Murray	J. S. Bach and Myra Hess	"Jesu, Joy of Man's Desiring"	
26 May 2001	Jenni Murray	Arr. Joseph Canteloube	Bailero (from Chants D'Auvergne)	
26 May 2001	Jenni Murray	Clara Schumann	The Violet	
26 May 2001	Jenni Murray	Elgar	"Pomp & Circumstance March" No. 1 In D	
26 May 2001	Jenni Murray	Ethel Smyth	Sarabande in D minor (from Four 4-Part Dances)	
26 May 2001	Jenni Murray	Hildegard Of Bingen	"Ave Generoso" (A Feather On the Breath of God)	
26 May 2001	Jenni Murray	Joan Baez	"Diamonds & Rust"	
26 May 2001	Jenni Murray	Milhaud	"Le Boeuf Sur Le Toit", Op. 58	
2 Jun 2001	Albert Irvin	Barry Guy	After the Rain (Opening)	
2 Jun 2001	Albert Irvin	Beethoven	Sonata in B♭, Op. 106 – Hammerklavier (Conclusion of 1st movement – Allegro)	
2 Jun 2001	Albert Irvin	Boulez	Eclat (Opening)	
2 Jun 2001	Albert Irvin	Irving Berlin	"Isn't This a Lovely Day to Be Caught in the Rain?"	
2 Jun 2001	Albert Irvin	Mahler	Symphony No. 1 (conclusion of last movement)	
2 Jun 2001	Albert Irvin	Morton Feldman	Rothko Chapel	
2 Jun 2001	Albert Irvin	Shostakovich	Cello Concerto No. 1 in E♭, Op. 107 (1st Movement – Allegretto)	
2 Jun 2001	Albert Irvin	Seymour Simons and Gerald Marks	"All of Me"	
9 Jun 2001	Geoffrey Robertson QC	Bob Dylan	"The Hurricane"	
9 Jun 2001	Geoffrey Robertson QC	Jacques Offenbach	Romance "Elle a fui, la tourterelle" (Antonia's Aria, The Tales of Hoffmann)	
9 Jun 2001	Geoffrey Robertson QC	Phil Ochs	"Love Me, I'm a Liberal"	
9 Jun 2001	Geoffrey Robertson QC	Puccini	"E Lucevan Le Stelle" (from Tosca)	
9 Jun 2001	Geoffrey Robertson QC	Arthur Sullivan	"When I, Good Friends, Was Called to The Bar" (Judge's Song from Trial By Jury)	
9 Jun 2001	Geoffrey Robertson QC	The Sex Pistols	"Pretty Vacant"	
9 Jun 2001	Geoffrey Robertson QC	Verdi	"Dieu, tu semas dans nos âmes" (Brotherhood Duet from Don Carlos, act 2, scene 1)	
9 Jun 2001	Geoffrey Robertson QC	Wagner	"Fire Music" (from Die Walküre, act 3)	
9 Jun 2001	Geoffrey Robertson QC	Kurt Weill	"Foolish Heart" (from One Touch of Venus)	
16 Jun 2001	Sir Roger Penrose	Bach	Adagio (2nd movement from Concerto for Oboe and Violin in C minor, BWV 1060)	
16 Jun 2001	Sir Roger Penrose	Leoš Janáček	Final Scene from The Makropoulos Case	
16 Jun 2001	Sir Roger Penrose	W. A. Mozart	Allegro (Finale from Piano Concerto No. 27 in B♭)	
16 Jun 2001	Sir Roger Penrose	Schubert	Nacht und Träume	
16 Jun 2001	Sir Roger Penrose	Stravinsky	The Masqueraders (from The Ballet Suite Petrushka)	
16 Jun 2001	Sir Roger Penrose	Bach	Et Misericordia (Duet from the Magnificat)	
16 Jun 2001	Sir Roger Penrose	Bach	Herr, Unser Herrscher (last 1/3 of 1st Chorus from The St John Passion)	
16 Jun 2001	Sir Roger Penrose	Bach	Zerfliesse, Mein Herz (Aria From Part 2 Of St John Passion)	
23 Jun 2001	Douglas Kennedy	Bach	Chromatic Fantasy and Fugue in D minor, BWV 903, Fugue	
23 Jun 2001	Douglas Kennedy	Brahms	Ein Deutsches Requiem:"Wie Lieblich Sind Deine Wohnungen"	
23 Jun 2001	Douglas Kennedy	W. A. Mozart	"Madamina, il catalogo è questo" (The Catalogue Aria, from Don Giovanni)	
23 Jun 2001	Douglas Kennedy	Shostakovich	Symphony No. 15, 3rd movement: Allegretto	
23 Jun 2001	Douglas Kennedy	Stravinsky	Ebony Concerto: final movement	
23 Jun 2001	Douglas Kennedy	Thomas Tallis	The Christmas Mass: Sanctus	
23 Jun 2001	Douglas Kennedy	Anton Webern	Six Pieces for Large Orchestra, Op. 6, Nos 3 & 4, Zart Bewegt & Langsam	
23 Jun 2001	Douglas Kennedy	Frank Zappa	"G-Spot Tornado" (from 'The Yellow Shark')	
30 Jun 2001	Nicholas Hytner	Britten	"The Moon Has Risen" From Curlew River	
30 Jun 2001	Nicholas Hytner	Ella Fitzgerald	"Bewitched, Bothered and Bewildered"	
30 Jun 2001	Nicholas Hytner	Handel	"Piangero" from Giulio Cesare	
30 Jun 2001	Nicholas Hytner	Haydn	2nd movement from String Quartet in C major "Emperor"	
30 Jun 2001	Nicholas Hytner	Leoš Janáček	Andante con Moto (5th movement) from 'Sinfonietta'	
30 Jun 2001	Nicholas Hytner	Stephen Sondheim	"Finishing the Hat" from Sunday in the Park with George	
30 Jun 2001	Nicholas Hytner	Stravinsky	Coda From Agon	
7 Jul 2001	Martin Fuller	Beethoven	Quartet in C♯ minor, Op. 131 (Finale – Allegro)	
7 Jul 2001	Martin Fuller	Mort Dixon and Ray Henderson	"Bye Bye Blackbird"	
7 Jul 2001	Martin Fuller	Duke Ellington and Bob Russell	"Don't Get Around Much Anymore"	
7 Jul 2001	Martin Fuller	Michael Berkeley	Clarinet Concerto (Exc.)	
7 Jul 2001	Martin Fuller	Charles Mingus	"Wham Bam Thank You Ma'am"	
7 Jul 2001	Martin Fuller	Oscar Brown Jr.	"Hazel's Hips"	
7 Jul 2001	Martin Fuller	Arnold Schoenberg	Moses und Aron (Opening)	
7 Jul 2001	Martin Fuller	Verdi	"Agnus Dei" (from Messa Da Requiem)	
14 Jul 2001	Annie Proulx	Austin Pitre	Les Flames D'Enfer (from Lou'Siana Dance Party)	
14 Jul 2001	Annie Proulx	Don Walser and Kronos Quartet	"Rose Marie" (from Down At The Skyvue Drive-In)	
14 Jul 2001	Annie Proulx	Francis Poulenc	Hommage à Edith Piaf (from 15 Improvisations)	
14 Jul 2001	Annie Proulx	Gillian Welch	Morphine (from Hell Among The Yearlings)	
14 Jul 2001	Annie Proulx	Jimmy Dale Gilmore	"Deep Eddy Blues"	
14 Jul 2001	Annie Proulx	John Adams	"Toot Nipple" (from John's Book of Alleged Dances)	
14 Jul 2001	Annie Proulx	Accordion Crimes	(published Fourth Estate, P292-3)	
14 Jul 2001	Annie Proulx	Valerio Longoria	Los Illegales	
14 Jul 2001	Annie Proulx	"Jelly Roll Rag"	(from Max Roach Presents The Uptown String Quartet)	
14 Jul 2001	Annie Proulx	Spiritual	(from Beyond The Missouri Sky)	
21 Jul 2001	Lucy Irvine	Anonymous work arr. Guido Haazen	Sanctus (from Missa Luba)	
21 Jul 2001	Lucy Irvine	Bach	Herr, Unser Herrscher (last 1/3 of 1st Chorus from the St John Passion)	
21 Jul 2001	Lucy Irvine	Michael Berkeley	Farewell	
21 Jul 2001	Lucy Irvine	Big Bill Broonzy	"All By Myself"	
21 Jul 2001	Lucy Irvine	Boccherini	Minuetto (from Quintet in E, Op. 11, No. 5)	
21 Jul 2001	Lucy Irvine	Bruckner	Symphony No. 4 in E♭ (recapitulation of first movement)	
21 Jul 2001	Lucy Irvine	William Byrd	Sixth Pavan and Galliard	
21 Jul 2001	Lucy Irvine	Satie	Profiter de Ce Qu'Il a des Cors aux Pieds Pour Lui Prendre Son Cerceau ("Taking Advantage of the Corns on His Toes to Take His Hoop Away from Him" from Peccadilles Importunes)	
21 Jul 2001	Lucy Irvine	Shostakovich	Foxtrot (from Jazz Suite No. 1)	
4 Aug 2001	Frances Spalding	Bach	"Widerstehe doch der Sünde" (opening aria from the cantata, BWV 54)	
4 Aug 2001	Frances Spalding	Alexander Borodin	Quartet No. 2 in D (Opening Of 3rd Movement – Nocturne)	
4 Aug 2001	Frances Spalding	Bréval	Sonata in C (1st movement exc.)	
4 Aug 2001	Frances Spalding	Mikhail Glinka	Mazurka in C minor	
4 Aug 2001	Frances Spalding	Arthur Herzog Jr. and Billie Holiday	"Don't Explain"	
4 Aug 2001	Frances Spalding	Mussorgsky	Trepak (from Songs and Dances of Death)	
4 Aug 2001	Frances Spalding	John Rutter	"The Lord Bless You and Keep You"	
4 Aug 2001	Frances Spalding	Dorothy Terriss and Julián Robledo	"Three O'Clock in the Morning"	
4 Aug 2001	Frances Spalding	Vivaldi	"Laudamus Te" (from Gloria)	
11 Aug 2001	Salley Vickers	William Byrd	Mass for Five Voices: Credo	
11 Aug 2001	Salley Vickers	Elvis Presley	"Are You Lonesome Tonight?"	
11 Aug 2001	Salley Vickers	Galuppi	Sonata No. 5 in C (1st movement, Andante)	
11 Aug 2001	Salley Vickers	W. A. Mozart	Piano Concerto No. 24 in C minor, K. 491 (2nd movement, Larghetto)	
11 Aug 2001	Salley Vickers	Rachmaninov	Vespers (Vigil) Nyne Otpushchaeshi (Nunc Dimittis)	
11 Aug 2001	Salley Vickers	Schubert	Impromptu Op. 90, No. 3 in G♭	
11 Aug 2001	Salley Vickers	W. A. Mozart	String Quintet G minor, K. 516 (1st movement, Allegro)	
18 Aug 2001	Richard Hoggart	Beethoven	Prisoners' Chorus (from Fidelio, act 1)	
18 Aug 2001	Richard Hoggart	Hank Cochran and Harlan Howard	"I Fall to Pieces"	
18 Aug 2001	Richard Hoggart	W. A. Mozart	"Là ci darem la mano" (from Don Giovanni, act 1)	
18 Aug 2001	Richard Hoggart	Hubert Parry	"Dear Lord and Father of Mankind"	
18 Aug 2001	Richard Hoggart	Jake Thackray	The Castleford Ladies Magic Circle	
18 Aug 2001	Richard Hoggart	Verdi	La traviata – prelude to act 3	
18 Aug 2001	Richard Hoggart	Verdi	"Pietà, rispetto, amore" (from Macbeth, act 4)	
18 Aug 2001	Richard Hoggart	Beethoven	Violin Sonata in F, Op. 24 – Spring (2nd movement – Adagio molto espressivo)	
25 Aug 2001	Anissa Helou	Bach	"Buß und Reu" (No. 6 from St Matthew Passion, BWV 244)	
25 Aug 2001	Anissa Helou	Beethoven	"Nur hurtig fort, nur frisch gegraben" (from Leonore, act 3)	
25 Aug 2001	Anissa Helou	Kantemiroglu	Muhayyer Peşrev	
25 Aug 2001	Anissa Helou	Leonard Cohen	"Suzanne"	
25 Aug 2001	Anissa Helou	Muhammed Abdenwahab	Laylat Hob	
25 Aug 2001	Anissa Helou	Puccini	"Mi chiamano Mimì" (from La bohème, act 1)	
25 Aug 2001	Anissa Helou	Sacko	Ousmane Sacko, Par Ousmane Sacko	
25 Aug 2001	Anissa Helou	Joseph Sakr	"El haleh taabane, ya Laila"	
25 Aug 2001	Anissa Helou	Houcine Toulali	Moroccan Cooking Song	
1 Sep 2001	Lee Langley	Billie Holiday	"Gloomy Sunday"	
1 Sep 2001	Lee Langley	Debussy	String Quartet in G minor (Scherzo, Assez vif et bien rythmé)	
1 Sep 2001	Lee Langley	Frank Loesser	"Baby, It's Cold Outside"	
1 Sep 2001	Lee Langley	Frederick The Great	Symphony in D major (1st movement, Allegro assai)	
1 Sep 2001	Lee Langley	Leoš Janáček	String Quartet No. 1 (The Kreutzer) (1st movement, Adagio Con Moto)	
1 Sep 2001	Lee Langley	W. A. Mozart	"Non v'è più tempo...Di scrivermi" (quintet from Cosí fan tutte act 1)	
1 Sep 2001	Lee Langley	Schubert	Quintet in C major (1st movement, exposition)	
1 Sep 2001	Lee Langley	Simon Richmond	"How to Score in Vienna" (from Küntstruk)	
1 Sep 2001	Lee Langley	António Sousa Freitas and Joaquim Campos	Caminhos De Deus (A Fado)	
1 Sep 2001	Lee Langley	Heitor Villa-Lobos	Bachianas Brasileiras No. 5	
8 Sep 2001	Eva Hoffman	Béla Bartók	Quartet No. 5 (3rd movement – Scherzo: Alla Bulgarese)	
8 Sep 2001	Eva Hoffman	Brahms	Violin Sonata in D minor, Op. 108 (1st movement – Allegro)	
8 Sep 2001	Eva Hoffman	Chopin	Etude in A minor, Op. 25/11	
8 Sep 2001	Eva Hoffman	Chopin	Mazurka in C♯ minor, Op. 6/2	
8 Sep 2001	Eva Hoffman	Debussy	"Pour les Notes Répetés" (from Douze Etudes)	
8 Sep 2001	Eva Hoffman	Aretha Franklin and Ted White	"Think"	
8 Sep 2001	Eva Hoffman	Schubert	Sonata in B♭, D. 960 (opening of 1st movement – Molto moderato)	
8 Sep 2001	Eva Hoffman	Traditional music	Two Duets from the Shopsko Region of Bulgaria	
8 Sep 2001	Eva Hoffman	Traditional Yiddish: Fidl Volach	The Klezmorin	
15 Sep 2001	Angela Flowers	Bach	Suite No. 5 in C minor, BWV 1011 (1st movement – Prélude)	
15 Sep 2001	Angela Flowers	John Frederick Coots and Haven Gillespie	"You Go to My Head"	
15 Sep 2001	Angela Flowers	Debussy	Sonata in G minor (1st movement – Allegro vivo)	
15 Sep 2001	Angela Flowers	Miles Davis	"Blue in Green"	
15 Sep 2001	Angela Flowers	Maurice Ravel	"Daybreak" (from Daphnis et Chloé)	
15 Sep 2001	Angela Flowers	Schubert	Impromptu in E♭, D. 899/2	
15 Sep 2001	Angela Flowers	Ralph Vaughan Williams	"The Roadside Fire" (from Songs of Travel)	
15 Sep 2001	Angela Flowers	Wagner	Prize Song (from Die Meistersinger von Nürnberg, act 3)	
22 Sep 2001	Melvyn Bragg	Beethoven	Kyrie Eleison (from Missa Solemnis, Op. 123)	
22 Sep 2001	Melvyn Bragg	Elgar	Cello Concerto in E minor, Op. 85 (3rd movement – Adagio)	
22 Sep 2001	Melvyn Bragg	Gluck	"What Is Life?" (from Orfeo ed Euridice)	
22 Sep 2001	Melvyn Bragg	Howard Goodall	"Love Divine"	
22 Sep 2001	Melvyn Bragg	Olivier Messiaen	"Joie du sang des étoiles" (from Turangalîla-Symphonie)	
22 Sep 2001	Melvyn Bragg	Bill Monroe	"Blue Moon of Kentucky"	
22 Sep 2001	Melvyn Bragg	Schubert	"An die Musik", D. 547	
22 Sep 2001	Melvyn Bragg	Wagner	"Isoldes Liebestod" (from Tristan Und Isolde)	
29 Sep 2001	Will Self	Beethoven	Piano Trio in D major, Op. 70/1 – "Ghost" (1st movement – Allegro vivace e con brio)	
29 Sep 2001	Will Self	Bob Dylan	"Blind Willie McTell"	
29 Sep 2001	Will Self	Bernie Hanighen and Clarence Williams and Thelonious Monk	"Round Midnight"	
29 Sep 2001	Will Self	Lassus	Introitus (from Requiem For Four Voices)	
29 Sep 2001	Will Self	Massive Attack	"Unfinished Sympathy"	
29 Sep 2001	Will Self	Richard Strauss	"Beim Schlafengehen" (from Four Last Songs)	
29 Sep 2001	Will Self	Fats Waller	"Ain't Misbehavin'"	
6 Oct 2001	Andro Linklater	John Adams	Nixon in China, act 2, scene 2: "Oh What a Day I Thought I'd Die" and "Whip Her to Death"	
6 Oct 2001	Andro Linklater	John Marbeck	Credo (from his Booke of Common Praier Noted)	
6 Oct 2001	Andro Linklater	Marianne Faithfull	"Broken English"	
6 Oct 2001	Andro Linklater	Ethelbert Nevin	The Rosary	
6 Oct 2001	Andro Linklater	Peter Maxwell Davies	"Mrs Linklater's Tune"	
6 Oct 2001	Andro Linklater	Traditional arr. Jean Redpath and Serge Hovey	Nine Inch Will Please a Lady (tune "The Quaker's Wife", words by Robert Burns)	
6 Oct 2001	Andro Linklater	Verdi	Un ballo in maschera, act 2 (finale)	
6 Oct 2001	Andro Linklater	Traditional Javanese Gamelan arr. Jean Redpath & Serge Hovey	Ujung Laut (The Shore)	
6 Oct 2001	Andro Linklater	Josephine Baker	La Petite Tonkinoise	
13 Oct 2001	Alan Brownjohn	Beethoven	Quartet in C♯ minor, Op. 131 (5th movement – Presto)	
13 Oct 2001	Alan Brownjohn	Debussy	"Clair De Lune" (from Fêtes Galantes)	
13 Oct 2001	Alan Brownjohn	Monteverdi	Chiome D'Oro	
13 Oct 2001	Alan Brownjohn	Johnny Răducanu	Danny Blues	
13 Oct 2001	Alan Brownjohn	Alan Rawsthorne	Symphony No. 2 – A Pastoral Symphony (4th Movement – Andante)	
13 Oct 2001	Alan Brownjohn	Reynaldo Hahn	Ciboulette (conclusion of act 1, scene 1)	
13 Oct 2001	Alan Brownjohn	Schubert	Piano Sonata In A, D. 959 (3rd Movement – Scherzo – Allegro Vivace)	
13 Oct 2001	Alan Brownjohn	Tiffen Le Martelot	"La Chanson d'un Dadaiste"	
13 Oct 2001	Alan Brownjohn	Michael Tippett	The Mask of Time (Conclusion)	
13 Oct 2001	Alan Brownjohn	Peter Warlock	Jillian of Berry + Pretty Ring Time	
20 Oct 2001	Anne Karpf	Abdullah Ibrahim	"Someday Soon Sweet Samba" (from Cape Town Revisited)	
20 Oct 2001	Anne Karpf	Brave Old World	"Rufn Di Kinder Aheym" (from Beyond The Pale)	
20 Oct 2001	Anne Karpf	Charles Mingus	"Wednesday Night Prayer Meeting" (from Blues and Roots)	
20 Oct 2001	Anne Karpf	Chopin	Nocturne in C♯ minor, Op. 27, No. 1	
20 Oct 2001	Anne Karpf	Mahler	Symphony No. 1 (3rd movement)	
20 Oct 2001	Anne Karpf	W. A. Mozart	Clarinet Quintet in A major, K. 581 (1st movement, exposition only)	
20 Oct 2001	Anne Karpf	Schubert	Fantasie in F minor, D940	
20 Oct 2001	Anne Karpf	The Eagles	"Hotel California"	
27 Oct 2001	Jeffrey Tobias	Bach	Partita No. 1 in B♭, BWV 825 (1st movement – Prelude)	
27 Oct 2001	Jeffrey Tobias	Britten	Billy's Monologue (from Billy Budd, act 2, scene 3)	
27 Oct 2001	Jeffrey Tobias	Gurney	"I Will Go with My Father A-Ploughing"	
27 Oct 2001	Jeffrey Tobias	Leoš Janáček	From the House of the Dead (opening of act 2)	
27 Oct 2001	Jeffrey Tobias	John Handy	Spanish Lady (exc.)	
27 Oct 2001	Jeffrey Tobias	Olivier Messiaen	"Regard de la Vierge" (excerpt) (from Vingt Regards sur l'Enfant-Jésus)	
27 Oct 2001	Jeffrey Tobias	Sergei Prokofiev	Sonata No. 7 in B♭, Op. 83 (3rd movement – Precipitato)	
27 Oct 2001	Jeffrey Tobias	Shostakovich	Piano Quintet in G minor, Op. 57 (3rd movement – Scherzo)	
27 Oct 2001	Jeffrey Tobias	Stravinsky	Soldier's March (from The Soldier's Tale)	
27 Oct 2001	Jeffrey Tobias	Richard Wagner	Siegmund and Sieglinde's Love Duet (from Die Walküre, act 1)	
3 Nov 2001	Jon Stallworthy	Beethoven	Symphony No. 6 In F, Op. 68 (Pastoral) 1st movement	
3 Nov 2001	Jon Stallworthy	Britten	War Requiem (from Libera Me, "I am the enemy you killed, my friend...")	
3 Nov 2001	Jon Stallworthy	Charles Dumont and Michel Vaucaire	"Non, je ne regrette rien"	
3 Nov 2001	Jon Stallworthy	Dylan Thomas	"Fern Hill" (poem)	
3 Nov 2001	Jon Stallworthy	Gilbert and Sullivan	Bunthorne's Song (Patience, act 1), "If You're Anxious for to Shine"	
3 Nov 2001	Jon Stallworthy	John Masefield	"Cargoes" (poem)	
3 Nov 2001	Jon Stallworthy	Jon Stallworthy	"The Bright Cloud" (poem)	
3 Nov 2001	Jon Stallworthy	Wilfred Owen	"Strange Meeting" (poem)	
3 Nov 2001	Jon Stallworthy	W. B. Yeats	"Dialogue of Self and Soul" (poem)	
10 Nov 2001	Fred Hersch	Bach	Presto (from Brandenburg Concerto No. 4 in G)	
10 Nov 2001	Fred Hersch	Duke Ellington	"The Mooche" (from Ellington Uptown)	
10 Nov 2001	Fred Hersch	Fred Hersch	Aria (from Songs Without Words)	
10 Nov 2001	Fred Hersch	Joni Mitchell	"River" (from Blue)	
10 Nov 2001	Fred Hersch	Miles Davis	"If I Were a Bell"	
10 Nov 2001	Fred Hersch	Ornette Coleman	"Tomorrow is the Question" (from Tomorrow Is the Question)	
10 Nov 2001	Fred Hersch	Ravel	Le Gibet (from Gaspard de La Nuit)	
10 Nov 2001	Fred Hersch	Toninho Horta	"Aqui Oh" (from Toninho Horta)	
17 Nov 2001	John Gage	Gregorio Allegri	Miserere (Opening)	
17 Nov 2001	John Gage	Barbara	Göttingen	
17 Nov 2001	John Gage	Beethoven	Symphony No. 6 In F, Op. 68 "Pastoral" (Finale – Shepherds' Song)	
17 Nov 2001	John Gage	Berlioz	Symphonie Fantastique, Op. 14 (Opening of 1st movement – Rêveries – Passions)	
17 Nov 2001	John Gage	Melanie C and Rhett Lawrence and Paul F. Cruz and Lisa Lopes and Max Martin	"Never Be the Same Again"	
17 Nov 2001	John Gage	Gluck	"Che Farò Senza Euridice" (from Orfeo ed Euridice)	
17 Nov 2001	John Gage	Franco Migliacci and Modugno	"Volare"	
17 Nov 2001	John Gage	Arnold Schoenberg	Piano Piece, Op. 11/1	
17 Nov 2001	John Gage	Traditional Bolivian	Yaravi	
24 Nov 2001	Andrew Marr	Bach	Prelude and Fugue in F minor, BWV 857 (from The Well-Tempered Clavier, book 1)	
24 Nov 2001	Andrew Marr	Bob Dylan	"Sad Eyed Lady of the Lowlands" (from Blonde On Blonde)	
24 Nov 2001	Andrew Marr	Robert Burns	"Ye Jacobites by Name" from Volume 2 of The Complete Songs Of Robert Burns	
24 Nov 2001	Andrew Marr	Burt Bacharach and Hal David	"24 Hours from Tulsa"	
24 Nov 2001	Andrew Marr	Marco Uccellini	Aria Quinta Sopra La Bergamasca	
24 Nov 2001	Andrew Marr	W. A. Mozart	"Se vuol ballare" (from Le nozze di Figaro, act 1)	
24 Nov 2001	Andrew Marr	Shostakovich	Piano Concerto No. 2 (2nd movement, Andante)	
1 Dec 2001	Robert Anderson	J. S. Bach	Sonata No. 3 in C, BWV 1005 (1st movement – Adagio)	
1 Dec 2001	Robert Anderson	Beethoven	Grosse Fuge, Op. 133 (opening)	
1 Dec 2001	Robert Anderson	Brahms	Trio in E♭, Op. 40 (1st movement – Andante)	
1 Dec 2001	Robert Anderson	John Dowland	"I Saw My Lady Weep"	
1 Dec 2001	Robert Anderson	Charles Ives	The Unanswered Question	
1 Dec 2001	Robert Anderson	W. A. Mozart	God is Our Refuge, K. 20	
1 Dec 2001	Robert Anderson	Richard Strauss	Frühling (from Four Last Songs)	
1 Dec 2001	Robert Anderson	Beethoven	"Nimm Sie Hin Denn, Diese Lieder" (from An Die Ferne Geliebte, Op. 98)	
8 Dec 2001	Colin Gough	Bach	Suite No. 1 in G, BWV 1007 (1st movement – Prélude)	
8 Dec 2001	Colin Gough	Beethoven	Quartet in B♭, Op. 130 (5th movement – Cavatina)	
8 Dec 2001	Colin Gough	Brahms	Violin Concerto in D, Op. 77 (Cadenza and Conclusion of 1st movement)	
8 Dec 2001	Colin Gough	Britten	Storm Interlude (from Peter Grimes)	
8 Dec 2001	Colin Gough	Handel	Dopo Notte (from Ariodante)	
8 Dec 2001	Colin Gough	W. A. Mozart	Overture: Le Nozze Di Figaro	
8 Dec 2001	Colin Gough	Richard Strauss	Morgen, Op. 27	
8 Dec 2001	Colin Gough	Wagner	Götterdämmerung (Conclusion)	
15 Dec 2001	Irma Kurtz	Bach	"Ei, wie schmeckt der Kaffee süße" (from Coffee Cantata, BWV 211)	
15 Dec 2001	Irma Kurtz	William Boyce	Symphony No. 5 in D (3rd movement – Tempo di Minuetto)	
15 Dec 2001	Irma Kurtz	Britten	"Dance of Death" (from Our Hunting Fathers)	
15 Dec 2001	Irma Kurtz	Leoš Janáček	Prelude (from The Cunning Little Vixen)	
15 Dec 2001	Irma Kurtz	Henry Purcell	Prelude and Trio – May the God of Wit Inspire (from The Fairy Queen)	
15 Dec 2001	Irma Kurtz	Ravel	"Five O'Clock Foxtrot" (from L'Enfant et les Sortilèges)	
15 Dec 2001	Irma Kurtz	Stephen Sondheim	"The Little Things You Do Together" (from Company)	
15 Dec 2001	Irma Kurtz	Tchaikovsky	Letter Scene (from Eugene Onegin)	
22 Dec 2001	Mussorgsky (aka John Sessions)	Mikhail Glinka	Ruslan and Lyudmila Overture	
22 Dec 2001	Mussorgsky (aka John Sessions)	Mussorgsky	Boris's Death Scene (from Boris Godunov)	
22 Dec 2001	Mussorgsky (aka John Sessions)	Nikolai Rimsky-Korsakov	Symphony No. 3 in C, Op. 32 (1st movement – Moderato Assai – Allegro)	
22 Dec 2001	Mussorgsky (aka John Sessions)	Balakirev	Islamey	
22 Dec 2001	Mussorgsky (aka John Sessions)	Mussorgsky	Catacombs (from Pictures At an Exhibition)	
22 Dec 2001	Mussorgsky (aka John Sessions)	Mussorgsky	Prelude to Khovanshchina	
22 Dec 2001	Mussorgsky (aka John Sessions)	Alexander Borodin	In the Steppes of Central Asia	
29 Dec 2001	Joseph Connolly	Bach	Prelude in C minor, BWV 999, and Courante (from Suite No. 2, BWV 1099)	
29 Dec 2001	Joseph Connolly	Geoffrey Burgon	"Rain In Venice" (from Brideshead Revisited)	
29 Dec 2001	Joseph Connolly	Arcangelo Corelli	Concerto Grosso in F, Op. 6/2 (1st and 2nd movements)	
29 Dec 2001	Joseph Connolly	Elmer Bernstein	"Man With the Golden Arm"	
29 Dec 2001	Joseph Connolly	George Gershwin	Rhapsody in Blue	
29 Dec 2001	Joseph Connolly	Gilbert and Sullivan	"I've Got a Little List" (from The Mikado)	
29 Dec 2001	Joseph Connolly	Irving Berlin	"Top Hat, White Tie and Tails"	
29 Dec 2001	Joseph Connolly	Max Harris	"Gurney Slade"	
29 Dec 2001	Joseph Connolly	Paul McCartney	"Somedays"	
29 Dec 2001	Joseph Connolly	Vivaldi	"Winter" (from The Four Seasons) (1st movement – Allegro Non Molto)	

== 2002 ==
Date	Guest	Composer	Title	Performer / Label
5 Jan 2002	Roger Graef	Ernest Bloch	Concerto Grosso for String Orchestra & Piano Obbligato. Finale: Fugue	
5 Jan 2002	Roger Graef	Charlie Parker	"Relaxing With Lee 2"	
5 Jan 2002	Roger Graef	Piers Hellawell	"A White Room"	
5 Jan 2002	Roger Graef	Kodály	Sonatina for Cello and Piano	
5 Jan 2002	Roger Graef	Amy Beach	Piano Quintet in F♯ minor, Op. 67 (2nd movement, Adagio wspressivo)	
5 Jan 2002	Roger Graef	Richard Strauss	"Aber der Richtige" (duet from Arabella, act 1)	
5 Jan 2002	Roger Graef	Traditional North Hungarian Lament	"Jaj, Jaj, Énneken Bánatos Anyának!" (Alas, Alas For Me, A Grieving Mother!)	
5 Jan 2002	Roger Graef	Virgil Thomson and Gertrude Stein	The Mother of Us All, end of the opera (act 2, scene 3)	
5 Jan 2002	Roger Graef	Kurt Weill	"Speak Low" (from One Touch of Venus)	
12 Jan 2002	Peter Kemp	J. S. Bach	Suite No. 1 in G, BWV 1007 (1st movement – Prelude)	
12 Jan 2002	Peter Kemp	Beethoven	Sonata In G, Op. 31/1 (opening of 2nd movement – Adagio Grazioso)	
12 Jan 2002	Peter Kemp	Reynaldo Hahn	"Sopra l'Acqua Indormenzada" (from Venezia – Chansons En Dialecte Vénitien)	
12 Jan 2002	Peter Kemp	Handel	"As Steals the Morn Upon the Night" (from L'Allegro, Il Penseroso ed Il Moderato)	
12 Jan 2002	Peter Kemp	Puccini	"Tre sbirri, una carrozza" (from Tosca, act 1)	
12 Jan 2002	Peter Kemp	Schubert	"Der Leiermann" (from Winterreise)	
12 Jan 2002	Peter Kemp	Verdi	"Ben'io t'invenni" (from Nabucco, act 2, scene 1)	
12 Jan 2002	Peter Kemp	Wagner	"Siegmund! Sieh auf mich" (from Die Walküre, act 2)	
19 Jan 2002	Jude Kelly	Nacio Herb Brown and Arthur Freed	"Singin' in the Rain"	
19 Jan 2002	Jude Kelly	Paul Buchanan and Robert Bell – The Blue Nile	"A Walk Across the Rooftops"	
19 Jan 2002	Jude Kelly	Donizetti	"Mad Scene" (from Lucia Di Lammermoor)	
19 Jan 2002	Jude Kelly	Elgar	"Where Corals Lie" (from Sea Pictures, Op. 37)	
19 Jan 2002	Jude Kelly	Haydn	Symphony No. 104 in D – "London"	
19 Jan 2002	Jude Kelly	Traditional Irish	Carrickfergus	
19 Jan 2002	Jude Kelly	John Cage	"In a Landscape"	
19 Jan 2002	Jude Kelly	Joni Mitchell	"Blue"	
26 Jan 2002	Philip Pullman	Beethoven	Egmont Overture, Op. 84	
26 Jan 2002	Philip Pullman	Vaughn Horton and Denver Darling and Milt Gabler	"Choo Choo Ch'Boogie"	
26 Jan 2002	Philip Pullman	Medtner	Sonata-Skazka in C minor, Op. 25/1 (2nd movement – Andantino con moto)	
26 Jan 2002	Philip Pullman	Miles Davis	"Miles" (from the album Milestones)	
26 Jan 2002	Philip Pullman	Doc Pomus and Mort Shuman	"Save the Last Dance for Me"	
26 Jan 2002	Philip Pullman	Sergei Prokofiev	Piano Concerto No. 2 in G minor, Op. 16 (2nd movement – Scherzo: Vivace)	
26 Jan 2002	Philip Pullman	Michael Tippett	Concerto for Double String Orchestra (3rd movement – Allegro Molto)	
26 Jan 2002	Philip Pullman	Vivaldi	"Sventurata Navicella" (from Giustino)	
2 Feb 2002	David McVicar	Britten	"And Farewell to Ye" from Billy Budd, act 4, scene 1	
2 Feb 2002	David McVicar	Handel	"Caro Speme" from Giulio Cesare In Egitto	
2 Feb 2002	David McVicar	Handel	"Praise the Lord" from Solomon, act 3	
2 Feb 2002	David McVicar	Harry Connick Jr	"If I Only Had A Brain"	
2 Feb 2002	David McVicar	W. A. Mozart	Quartet "Cieli, che vedo?" from Idomeneo, act 3, scene 1	
2 Feb 2002	David McVicar	Nina Simone	"For All We Know'"	
2 Feb 2002	David McVicar	Ravel	"La Flûte Enchantée" from Shérérazade	
2 Feb 2002	David McVicar	Vladimir Martynov	Movement 1 from "Come In!"	
9 Feb 2002	Hanif Kureishi	Arvo Pärt	Spiegel Im Spiegel (Mirror in the Mirror)	
9 Feb 2002	Hanif Kureishi	Bill Frisell	Outlaws	
9 Feb 2002	Hanif Kureishi	John Cage	Sonata No. 1 (from Sonatas and Interludes)	
9 Feb 2002	Hanif Kureishi	John Lennon and Paul McCartney	"Hello, Goodbye"	
9 Feb 2002	Hanif Kureishi	Miles Davis	"Ife" (excerpt) (from the album Big Fun)	
9 Feb 2002	Hanif Kureishi	Steve Reich	America – Before the War (excerpt) (from Different Trains)	
9 Feb 2002	Hanif Kureishi	Zakir Hussain	"Making Music"	
16 Feb 2002	Prof. Sir Tom Blundell	Vincenzo Bellini	"Qual cor tradisti" (from Norma, act 2, scene 3)	
16 Feb 2002	Prof. Sir Tom Blundell	Lewis Allan	"Strange Fruit"	
16 Feb 2002	Prof. Sir Tom Blundell	Charles Mingus	"Wednesday Night Prayer Meeting"	
16 Feb 2002	Prof. Sir Tom Blundell	W. A. Mozart	Concerto for Flute and Harp in C, K. 299 (2nd movement – Andantino)	
16 Feb 2002	Prof. Sir Tom Blundell	Traditional music	Man Akteia Beparwah de Naal	
16 Feb 2002	Prof. Sir Tom Blundell	Traditional music	Soukoura	
16 Feb 2002	Prof. Sir Tom Blundell	Verdi	"Gia nella notte densa" (from Otello, act 1)	
23 Feb 2002	Christopher Hunt	Bach	"Angenehmes Wiederau" (from cantata BWV 30a)	
23 Feb 2002	Christopher Hunt	Traditional Batak	"Patahuak Ni Manuk"	
23 Feb 2002	Christopher Hunt	Harrison Birtwistle	"Morgan Goes Through Into the Blizzard" (from Gawain's Journey)	
23 Feb 2002	Christopher Hunt	Gabriel Fauré	"Pièce"	
23 Feb 2002	Christopher Hunt	Handel	"Va Tacito E Nascosto" (from Giulio Cesare)	
23 Feb 2002	Christopher Hunt	Johann Christian Bach	"Would You A Female Heart Inspire" (from Vauxhall Songs)	
23 Feb 2002	Christopher Hunt	John Lennon and Paul McCartney	"Ticket To Ride"	
23 Feb 2002	Christopher Hunt	W. A. Mozart	Horn Concerto in D, K. 412 (2nd movement – Rondo: Allegro)	
23 Feb 2002	Christopher Hunt	Not Available	The Song Of A Blackbird	
23 Feb 2002	Christopher Hunt	Schubert	Sonata in G, D. 894 (3rd movement – Menuetto: Allegro Moderato)	
23 Feb 2002	Christopher Hunt	W. A. Mozart	Masonic Funeral Music, K. 477	
2 Mar 2002	Tony Lewis(?)	Beethoven	Violin Concerto in D, Op. 61 (1st movement Excerpt)	
2 Mar 2002	Tony Lewis(?)	Chopin	Nocturne No. 13 in C minor, Op. 48, No. 1	
2 Mar 2002	Tony Lewis(?)	Handel	Vouchsafe O Lord (from The Dettingen Te Deum)	
2 Mar 2002	Tony Lewis(?)	Haydn	Virgo Virginum Praeclara (from The Stabat Mater)	
2 Mar 2002	Tony Lewis(?)	Karg-Elert	Choral Improvisation "Nun Danket Alle Gott"	
2 Mar 2002	Tony Lewis(?)	Schubert	String Quintet in C major (1st movement, exposition only)	
2 Mar 2002	Tony Lewis(?)	Joanne / Crugybar / Ebenezer	Medley of Welsh Hymn Tunes	
9 Mar 2002	Sebastian Faulks	Dionne Warwick	"Heartbreaker"	
9 Mar 2002	Sebastian Faulks	Dionne Warwick	"Do You Know the Way to San Jose"	
9 Mar 2002	Sebastian Faulks	Gabriel Fauré	Sanctus from Requiem Op. 48	
9 Mar 2002	Sebastian Faulks	Miles Davis	"It Never Entered My Mind"	
9 Mar 2002	Sebastian Faulks	Ravel	Adagio assai from Piano Concerto in G major	
9 Mar 2002	Sebastian Faulks	Sibelius	Allegro Molto (movement 3) from Symphony No. 5	
9 Mar 2002	Sebastian Faulks	Steely Dan	"Doctor Wu" from Katy Lied	
9 Mar 2002	Sebastian Faulks	Terry Riley	In C	
16 Mar 2002	Simon Armitage	Duruflé	"Pie Jesu" (from Requiem, Op. 9)	
16 Mar 2002	Simon Armitage	Scott Walker	"Montague Terrace in Blue"	
16 Mar 2002	Simon Armitage	Damian O'Neill and Michael Bradley	"My Perfect Cousin"	
16 Mar 2002	Simon Armitage	Arvo Pärt	Cantus In Memory of Benjamin Britten	
16 Mar 2002	Simon Armitage	Radiohead	"Like Spinning Plates"	
16 Mar 2002	Simon Armitage	Ravel	Menuet (from Le Tombeau de Couperin)	
16 Mar 2002	Simon Armitage	Serious Drinking	Spirit of '66	
16 Mar 2002	Simon Armitage	John Tavener	"The Lamb"	
16 Mar 2002	Simon Armitage	Traditional music	"He's Got the Whole World in His Hands"	
16 Mar 2002	Simon Armitage	Hugo Wolf	"Auf Ein Altes Bild"	
23 Mar 2002	Anthony Burton	Bach	"Ei! Wie Schmeckt der Coffee Süsse" (from The Coffee Cantata)	
23 Mar 2002	Anthony Burton	Béla Bartók	Prestissimo, con sordino (2nd movement, String Quartet No. 4)	
23 Mar 2002	Anthony Burton	Harrison Birtwistle	Clock 5 (from Harrison's Clocks)	
23 Mar 2002	Anthony Burton	Dizzy Gillespie and Charlie Parker	"A Night In Tunisia"	
23 Mar 2002	Anthony Burton	Olivier Messiaen	Chronochromie (introduction)	
23 Mar 2002	Anthony Burton	Praetorius	La Bourrée (from Dances from Terpsichore)	
23 Mar 2002	Anthony Burton	Stravinsky	Dances of the Peasant and Bear; and Gypsy Girls from Petrushka	
23 Mar 2002	Anthony Burton	Thelonious Monk	"Blue Monk"	
23 Mar 2002	Anthony Burton	Kurt Weill	"Bilbao Song" (from Happy End)	
30 Mar 2002	Peter Parker	Britten	"Dance of Death" (from Our Hunting Fathers, Op. 8)	
30 Mar 2002	Peter Parker	Noël Coward	"Any Little Fish" (from Cochran's 1931 Revue)	
30 Mar 2002	Peter Parker	Ernst Krenek	"Jonny Spielt Auf" (final scene)	
30 Mar 2002	Peter Parker	Cole Porter	"Ev'ry Time We Say Goodbye"	
30 Mar 2002	Peter Parker	Arthur Somervell	"The Lads in Their Hundreds" (from A Shropshire Lad)	
30 Mar 2002	Peter Parker	Stravinsky	"No Word from Tom" (from The Rake's Progress, act 1, scene 3)	
30 Mar 2002	Peter Parker	Traditional Brazilian	Soca Pilao (Coffee Pounding)	
30 Mar 2002	Peter Parker	Kurt Weill	"Das Lied vom Schlaraffenland" (from Der Silbersee)	
6 Apr 2002	Clive James	Bizet	"Au Fond Du Temple Saint" (from The Pearl Fishers)	
6 Apr 2002	Clive James	Donizetti	"Chi mi frena in tal momento" (from Lucia di Lammermoor, act 2)	
6 Apr 2002	Clive James	Édith Piaf and Charles Dumont	"La Belle Histoire De L'Amour"	
6 Apr 2002	Clive James	Ida Cox	"Nobody Knows You When You're Down and Out"	
6 Apr 2002	Clive James	Arthur Johnston and Johnny Burke	"Pennies From Heaven"	
6 Apr 2002	Clive James	Arthur Johnston and Sam Coslow	"My Old Flame"	
6 Apr 2002	Clive James	Gus Kahn and Wilbur Schwandt and Fabian Andre	"Dream a Little Dream of Me"	
6 Apr 2002	Clive James	Vincent Rose, Larry Stock and Al Lewis	"Blueberry Hill"	
6 Apr 2002	Clive James	Heinz Meier and Johnny Mercer	"Summer Wind"	
6 Apr 2002	Clive James	Puccini	"O soave fanciulla" (from La bohème, act 1)	
6 Apr 2002	Clive James	Merle Travis	"Sixteen Tons"	
13 Apr 2002	Clare Francis	Britten	"And Farewell to Ye, Old Rights o' Man" (from Billy Budd, act 2, scene 3)	
13 Apr 2002	Clare Francis	Leoš Janáček	String Quartet No. 1 – "Kreutzer Sonata" (1st movement – Adagio Con Moto)	
13 Apr 2002	Clare Francis	Liszt	Un Sospiro	
13 Apr 2002	Clare Francis	W. A. Mozart	Lacrimosa (from Requiem, K. 626)	
13 Apr 2002	Clare Francis	Richard Strauss	"Hab' mir's gelobt" (from Der Rosenkavalier, act 3)	
13 Apr 2002	Clare Francis	Tan Dun	Farewell (from Crouching Tiger, Hidden Dragon)	
13 Apr 2002	Clare Francis	Tchaikovsky	"Lyubvi vsye vazrasti pokorni" (from Eugene Onegin, act 3, scene 1)	
13 Apr 2002	Clare Francis	Verdi	"Esterrefatta fisso" (from Otello, act 3)	
20 Apr 2002	Wendy Cope	Bach	Cello Suite in G major – Courante (3rd movement)	
20 Apr 2002	Wendy Cope	Beethoven	String Quartet in B♭, Op. 130 (4th movement)	
20 Apr 2002	Wendy Cope	Britten	"There Is No Rose" (from A Ceremony of Carols)	
20 Apr 2002	Wendy Cope	Gluck	"What Is Life To Me Without Thee?" (from Orfeo ed Euridice)	
20 Apr 2002	Wendy Cope	Handel	Recorder Sonata in C (last movement: Allegro)	
20 Apr 2002	Wendy Cope	Judith Weir	The Romance of Count Arnaldos	
20 Apr 2002	Wendy Cope	W. A. Mozart	Piano Sonata in B♭, K. 570 (1st movement: Allegro)	
20 Apr 2002	Wendy Cope	Schubert	Im Frühling	
20 Apr 2002	Wendy Cope	Thomas Tallis	Lamentations of Jeremiah	
27 Apr 2002	Nigel Williams	Alaska	Hereafter	
27 Apr 2002	Nigel Williams	J. S. Bach	"Kyrie" (from Mass in B minor)	
27 Apr 2002	Nigel Williams	Elgar	"Salut D'Amour"	
27 Apr 2002	Nigel Williams	W. A. Mozart	Piano Concerto in D minor, K. 466 (2nd movement, Romanze)	
27 Apr 2002	Nigel Williams	Muddy Waters	"Trouble No More"	
27 Apr 2002	Nigel Williams	Orlando Gibbons	"This is the Record of John"	
27 Apr 2002	Nigel Williams	Bach	The Aria from The Goldberg Variations	
4 May 2002	Kathy Lette	Bessie Smith	"Kitchen Man"	
4 May 2002	Kathy Lette	Blossom Dearie	"I'm Hip"	
4 May 2002	Kathy Lette	Brian Wilson	"Surfer Girl"	
4 May 2002	Kathy Lette	Fanny Mendelssohn	Piano Trio in D minor, Op. 11 (2nd movement: Andante espressivo)	
4 May 2002	Kathy Lette	W. A. Mozart	The end of the finale of act 2 from Così fan tutte	
4 May 2002	Kathy Lette	Noël Coward	"I Went to a Marvellous Party"	
4 May 2002	Kathy Lette	Razaf and Belledna	"Kitchen Man"	
4 May 2002	Kathy Lette	Richard Strauss	Duet from the end of act 1 of Der Rosenkavalier	
11 May 2002	Mario Vargas Llosa	Bruckner	Scherzo Schnell (from Symphony No. 1 in C minor)	
11 May 2002	Mario Vargas Llosa	Antonín Dvořák	Part of 1st movement of Symphony No. 9 in E minor, "The New World"	
11 May 2002	Mario Vargas Llosa	Mahler	End of 1st movement from Symphony No. 2, "The Resurrection"	
11 May 2002	Mario Vargas Llosa	W. A. Mozart	The appearance of the statue, from Don Giovanni (finale to act 2)	
11 May 2002	Mario Vargas Llosa	Carl Orff	"O Fortuna" (from Carmina Burana)	
11 May 2002	Mario Vargas Llosa	Sibelius	Adagio di molto from Violin Concerto in D minor, Op. 47	
11 May 2002	Mario Vargas Llosa	Stravinsky	Scene 2 from The Firebird	
18 May 2002	Niall Ferguson	Beethoven	Piano Sonata In C, Op. 53 The Waldstein (First Movement, Allegro)	
18 May 2002	Niall Ferguson	Vincenzo Bellini	"Perfido! ... Or Basti!" and "Vanne, si mi lascia, indegno" (from Norma, act 1, scene 2)	
18 May 2002	Niall Ferguson	Cannonball Adderley	"Mercy, Mercy, Mercy"	
18 May 2002	Niall Ferguson	Robert Burns	"Hey Ca' Thro" and "The Deil's Awa wi' the Exciseman"	
18 May 2002	Niall Ferguson	Schubert	"Der Leiermann" (from Winterreise)	
25 May 2002	Arnold Wesker	C. P. E. Bach	"Magnificat Anima Mea" (from Magnificat, Wq. 215)	
25 May 2002	Arnold Wesker	Elgar	"Sabbath Morning At Sea" (from Sea Pictures, Op. 37)	
25 May 2002	Arnold Wesker	Ewan Maccoll and Charlie Parker and Peggy Seeger	Singin' the Fishin'	
25 May 2002	Arnold Wesker	Frank Loesser	"Never Will I Marry"	
25 May 2002	Arnold Wesker	Michael Nyman	String Quartet No. 3 (opening)	
25 May 2002	Arnold Wesker	Arnold Schoenberg	Gurrelieder (conclusion)	
25 May 2002	Arnold Wesker	Shikeiki Saegusa	Yamato Takeru (excerpt from Scene 3)	
25 May 2002	Arnold Wesker	Traditional Jewish	"Eili Eili"	
25 May 2002	Arnold Wesker	Traditional Transylvanian Jewish	Khosid Wedding Dance	
1 Jun 2002	Howard Jacobson	Bach	"Schlummert Ein, Ihr Matten Augen" (from Cantata No. 82 Ich Habe Genug)	
1 Jun 2002	Howard Jacobson	Lehár	"Lippen schweigen" (Waltz Song from The Merry Widow, act 3)	
1 Jun 2002	Howard Jacobson	Claudio Monteverdi	"Ardo a scoprire"	
1 Jun 2002	Howard Jacobson	W. A. Mozart	"Là ci darem la mano" (from Don Giovanni, act 1, scene 3)	
1 Jun 2002	Howard Jacobson	Percy Grainger	"Shallow Brown"	
1 Jun 2002	Howard Jacobson	Puccini	"Che gelida manina" (from La bohème, act 1)	
1 Jun 2002	Howard Jacobson	Schubert	Andante un poco mosso (part of the 2nd movement from Piano Trio in B♭, D 898)	
1 Jun 2002	Howard Jacobson	Eric Stewart and Graham Gouldman	"I'm Not In Love"	
1 Jun 2002	Howard Jacobson	Vivian Ellis	"This Is My Lovely Day" (from Bless the Bride)	
8 Jun 2002	Sir Paul Nurse	Anonymous work	Part of De Grad'A Santa Maria (from The Pilgrimage to Santiago)	
8 Jun 2002	Sir Paul Nurse	Beethoven	Sonata in F minor, Op. 57 "Appassionata" (2nd movement: Andante con moto)	
8 Jun 2002	Sir Paul Nurse	Brahms	"Denn alles Fleisch, es ist wie Gras" (A German Requiem, Op. 45)	
8 Jun 2002	Sir Paul Nurse	Britten	"Now The Hungry Lion Roars" (A Midsummer Night's Dream)	
8 Jun 2002	Sir Paul Nurse	Handel	Sonata In F (Larghetto and Allegro)	
8 Jun 2002	Sir Paul Nurse	Philip Glass	Akhnaten (prelude to act 1)	
8 Jun 2002	Sir Paul Nurse	Henry Purcell	"Sound the Trumpet" (from Birthday Ode, Come Ye Sons Of Art Away)	
8 Jun 2002	Sir Paul Nurse	Schubert	String Quintet In C, D956 (opening of 2nd movement, Adagio)	
8 Jun 2002	Sir Paul Nurse	Shostakovich	String Quartet No. 8, Op. 110 (2nd movement, Allegro Molto)	
15 Jun 2002	Guy Barker	Arthur Honegger	Largo for Strings	
15 Jun 2002	Guy Barker	Bernard Herrmann	Prelude and Rooftop from the soundtrack to Vertigo	
15 Jun 2002	Guy Barker	Bohuslav Martinu	Poco Allegro (Movement 1) from Double Concerto For 2 String Orchestras, Piano and Timpani	
15 Jun 2002	Guy Barker	Charles Mingus	Solo Dancer from The Black Saint and the Sinner Lady	
15 Jun 2002	Guy Barker	Dave Douglas	"Spring Ahead" from Stargazer	
15 Jun 2002	Guy Barker	Guy Barker	"Underdogs" from Soundtrack	
15 Jun 2002	Guy Barker	Miles Davis	"Baby Won't You Please Come Home" from Seven Steps to Heaven	
15 Jun 2002	Guy Barker	Nancy Wilson	Lush Life	
15 Jun 2002	Guy Barker	Perico Sambeat	"Drume Negrita" from Perico	
22 Jun 2002	Sheena McDonald	John Adams	Meister Eckhardt and Quackie (opening) (from Harmonielehre)	
22 Jun 2002	Sheena McDonald	Alban Berg	Wozzeck: act 1, scene 1	
22 Jun 2002	Sheena McDonald	Esbjörn Svensson	"Somewhere Else Before"	
22 Jun 2002	Sheena McDonald	W. A. Mozart	"Qui Tollis" (from Mass in C minor, K. 427)	
22 Jun 2002	Sheena McDonald	Arvo Pärt	Cantus in Memory of Benjamin Britten	
22 Jun 2002	Sheena McDonald	Sergei Prokofiev	Piano Concerto No. 1 in D♭ (opening – Allegro Brioso)	
22 Jun 2002	Sheena McDonald	Shostakovich	Symphony No. 13 "Babi Yar" (opening of 1st movement – Adagio)	
29 Jun 2002	George Steiner	Attrib. Handel	"Dank Sei Dir, Herr"	
29 Jun 2002	George Steiner	Charles Dumont and Michel Vaucaire	"Non, Je Ne Regrette Rien"	
29 Jun 2002	George Steiner	Carlo Gesualdo	"Moro Lasso Al Mio Duolo"	
29 Jun 2002	George Steiner	Liszt	"La Lugubre Gondola"	
29 Jun 2002	George Steiner	Oscar Hammerstein II	"Lover Come Back to Me"	
29 Jun 2002	George Steiner	Francis Poulenc	C	
29 Jun 2002	George Steiner	Salamone Rossi	Baruch haba b'shem Adonai	
29 Jun 2002	George Steiner	Schubert	Der Wanderer, D649	
6 Jul 2002	Serena Sutcliffe	J. S. Bach	Ich habe genug, BWV 82	
6 Jul 2002	Serena Sutcliffe	Brahms	Alto Rhapsody, Op. 53 (Conclusion)	
6 Jul 2002	Serena Sutcliffe	Giovanni Gabrieli	Magnificat	
6 Jul 2002	Serena Sutcliffe	Haydn	Cello Concerto In C (1st movement – Moderato)	
6 Jul 2002	Serena Sutcliffe	Schubert	Liebesbotschaft (from Schwanengesang, D. 957)	
6 Jul 2002	Serena Sutcliffe	Robert Schumann	"Wen Ich in Deine Augen Seh" (from Dichterliebe, Op. 48)	
6 Jul 2002	Serena Sutcliffe	Thomas Tallis	Salvator Mundi	
6 Jul 2002	Serena Sutcliffe	Mikis Theodorakis	"The Train Leaves at Eight"	
13 Jul 2002	The Rt Hon Robert Carr	Irving Berlin	"Moonshine Lullaby" (from Annie Get Your Gun)	
13 Jul 2002	The Rt Hon Robert Carr	Leoš Janáček	Closing Scene from Jenufa	
13 Jul 2002	The Rt Hon Robert Carr	John Kander (music) Fred Ebb (lyrics)	"Razzle Dazzle" (from Chicago)	
13 Jul 2002	The Rt Hon Robert Carr	Matthew Locke	"Curtin Tune" (For Shadwell's The Tempest, 1674)	
13 Jul 2002	The Rt Hon Robert Carr	Ross Edwards	Maninyas – Concerto for Violin and Orchestra (3rd movement)	
13 Jul 2002	The Rt Hon Robert Carr	Verdi	Excerpt from Don Carlo, act 3, scene 2 (scene of the Flemish Deputies)	
13 Jul 2002	The Rt Hon Robert Carr	Wagner	Sachs' introduction and quintet from act 3 of Die Meistersinger Von Nürnberg	
20 Jul 2002	Anthony Gottlieb	J. S. Bach	Partita No. 5 in G, BWV 829 (1st movement – Praeambulum)	
20 Jul 2002	Anthony Gottlieb	Beethoven	Symphony No. 7 in A, Op. 92 (2nd movement – Allegretto)	
20 Jul 2002	Anthony Gottlieb	Leonard Bernstein	"Conga!" (from Wonderful Town)	
20 Jul 2002	Anthony Gottlieb	Brahms	A German Requiem, Op. 45 (opening)	
20 Jul 2002	Anthony Gottlieb	George Gershwin	"I Got Rhythm" (2 versions) (pub. Chappell)	
20 Jul 2002	Anthony Gottlieb	Mahler	"Das Trinklied vom Jammer der Erde" (from Das Lied von der Erde)	
20 Jul 2002	Anthony Gottlieb	Rachmaninov	Piano Concerto No. 3 in D minor, Op. 30 (opening of 1st movement)	
27 Jul 2002	Stan Barstow	Berlioz	Absence (from Les Nuits d'Été, Op. 7)	
27 Jul 2002	Stan Barstow	Eric Ball	Resurgam (Conclusion)	
27 Jul 2002	Stan Barstow	W. A. Mozart	Serenade in D, K. 320 – Posthorn (1st movement – Adagio Maestoso – Allegro Spirito)	
27 Jul 2002	Stan Barstow	Puccini	"Quando me'n vo' soletta" ("Musetta's Waltz", song from La bohème)	
27 Jul 2002	Stan Barstow	Richard Strauss	Interlude in A♭ (from Intermezzo)	
27 Jul 2002	Stan Barstow	Tchaikovsky	"Pas de deux" (from The Nutcracker, act 2)	
27 Jul 2002	Stan Barstow	Kurt Weill	"This Is New" (from Lady in the Dark)	
3 Aug 2002	Mike Westbrook	Charlie Parker	"Donna Lee"	
3 Aug 2002	Mike Westbrook	Duke Ellington	"23rd Psalm" from Black, Brown & Beige	
3 Aug 2002	Mike Westbrook	Gerry Mulligan arr. Gil Evans	"Moondreams" from Rebirth Of The Cool	
3 Aug 2002	Mike Westbrook	Jimmy Yancey	"Death Letter Blues"	
3 Aug 2002	Mike Westbrook	Louis Armstrong	"West End Blues"	
3 Aug 2002	Mike Westbrook	Mike Westbrook	"Riding Down to Platterback" from 'Platterback'	
3 Aug 2002	Mike Westbrook	Ornette Coleman	"Lonely Woman" from The Shape of Jazz to Come	
3 Aug 2002	Mike Westbrook	Gioachino Rossini	"Overture" from Barber of Seville	
3 Aug 2002	Mike Westbrook	Stravinsky	"Le Petit Concert" from The Soldier's Tale	
10 Aug 2002	Timothy O'Brien (?)	Bach and Busoni	"Wachet Auf, Ruft Uns Die Stimme" (Sleepers Wake from Cantata 140)	
10 Aug 2002	Timothy O'Brien (?)	Beethoven	Fidelio (quartet from act 1)	
10 Aug 2002	Timothy O'Brien (?)	Alban Berg	Wozzeck (act 1, scene 2)	
10 Aug 2002	Timothy O'Brien (?)	Berlioz	Villanelle (from Nuits d'Été)	
10 Aug 2002	Timothy O'Brien (?)	César Franck	Symphonic Variations	
10 Aug 2002	Timothy O'Brien (?)	Leoš Janáček	The Cunning Little Vixen (end of act 2)	
10 Aug 2002	Timothy O'Brien (?)	Komeda	"Sleep Safe and Warm"	
10 Aug 2002	Timothy O'Brien (?)	Stravinsky	The Rake's Progress (excerpt from act 3, scene 3)	
10 Aug 2002	Timothy O'Brien (?)	Wagner	Die Meistersinger von Nürnberg (excerpt from act 3, scene 4, quintet)	
25 Aug 2002	Susan Wollenberg	Clara Schumann	Song 'Liebst du um Schönheit'	
25 Aug 2002	Susan Wollenberg	C. P. E. Bach	Rondo in E minor "Abschied vom Silbermannschen Clavier"	
25 Aug 2002	Susan Wollenberg	Fanny Mendelssohn	Song Without Words For Piano	
25 Aug 2002	Susan Wollenberg	Haydn	Allegro from Horn Concerto No. 1 in D major	
25 Aug 2002	Susan Wollenberg	Salomone Rossi	"Eftach Na Sefatai" from Les Cantiques de Salomon	
25 Aug 2002	Susan Wollenberg	Schubert	Allegro from Piano Trio in E♭ major, Op. 100	
25 Aug 2002	Susan Wollenberg	William Byrd	Anthem "Sing Joyfully"	
31 Aug 2002	Anatole Kaletsky	Bach	Now from The Sixth Hour & Be Near Me, Lord, When Dying (from St Matthew Passion)	
31 Aug 2002	Anatole Kaletsky	Chopin	Nocturne in F, Op. 15/1	
31 Aug 2002	Anatole Kaletsky	Elgar	"Go Forth upon Thy Journey" (from The Dream Of Gerontius, Op. 38)	
31 Aug 2002	Anatole Kaletsky	W. A. Mozart	"Sento, o Dio, che questo piede è restio" (from Così fan tutte, act 1)	
31 Aug 2002	Anatole Kaletsky	Paganini	Violin Concerto No. 1 in D, Op. 6 (exc. from 1st movement – Allegro Maestoso)	
31 Aug 2002	Anatole Kaletsky	Stravinsky	Russian Dance (from Three Movements from Petrushka)	
31 Aug 2002	Anatole Kaletsky	Karol Szymanowski	"The Fountain of Arethusa" (from Myths, Op. 30)	
31 Aug 2002	Anatole Kaletsky	Tchaikovsky	Manfred Symphony, Op. 58 (conclusion Of 1st movement – Moderato Con Moto)	
7 Sep 2002	Niamh Cusack	Bach	Prelude from Cello Suite in D major S1012	
7 Sep 2002	Niamh Cusack	B.B. King	Every Day I Have The Blues	
7 Sep 2002	Niamh Cusack	Brahms	2nd movement Andante, from Concerto for Violin, Cello and orchestra in A minor, Op. 102	
7 Sep 2002	Niamh Cusack	Keith Jarrett	Part IIc from The Koln Concert	
7 Sep 2002	Niamh Cusack	Omara Portuondo	No Me Ilores Mas	
7 Sep 2002	Niamh Cusack	Richard Strauss	1st movement, Allegro moderato, from Concerto for Oboe and Small Orchestra in D major	
7 Sep 2002	Niamh Cusack	Traditional arr. Christy Moore	"Raggle Taggle Gypsy"	
7 Sep 2002	Niamh Cusack	Bono and The Edge – U2	"Stuck in a Moment You Can't Get Out Of"	
14 Sep 2002	Ronald Harwood	Beethoven	Quoniam (Conclusion Of Gloria from Missa Solemnis, Op. 123)	
14 Sep 2002	Ronald Harwood	Britten	"Be slowly lifted up" and Lacrimosa (from War Requiem)	
14 Sep 2002	Ronald Harwood	Mahler	Wo die Schönen Trompeten Blasen (from Des Knaben Wunderhorn)	
14 Sep 2002	Ronald Harwood	Eric Maschwitz and Manning Sherwin	"A Nightingale Sang in Berkeley Square"	
14 Sep 2002	Ronald Harwood	W. A. Mozart	Symphony No. 40 in G minor, K. 550 (1st movement – Molto allegro)	
14 Sep 2002	Ronald Harwood	Schubert	Sonata in D, D 850 (beginning of 2nd movement – Con Moto)	
14 Sep 2002	Ronald Harwood	Tchaikovsky arr. Ellington & Strayhorn	Sugar Rum Cherry (From The Nutcracker Suite)	
21 Sep 2002	Robert Fox	George Butterworth	"Loveliest of Trees" (from A Shropshire Lad)	
21 Sep 2002	Robert Fox	Domenico Cimarosa	Oboe Concerto in C (1st movement – Introduzione)	
21 Sep 2002	Robert Fox	Leonard Cohen	"Alexandra Leaving"	
21 Sep 2002	Robert Fox	W. A. Mozart	"Conoscete, signor Figaro" (from Le nozze di Figaro, act 2)	
21 Sep 2002	Robert Fox	Tomás Luis De Victoria	Kyrie (from Missa Pro Defunctis)	
21 Sep 2002	Robert Fox	Vivaldi	"Veni, Veni, Me Sequere" (from Juditha Triumphans)	
21 Sep 2002	Robert Fox	W. A. Mozart	"Ruhe sanft, mein holdes Leben" (from Zaide)	
21 Sep 2002	Robert Fox	W. A. Mozart	Sonata in D, K. 448 (3rd movement – Allegro molto)	
28 Sep 2002	Jane Stevenson	Anonymous work	In Taberna Quando Sumus (from Carmina Burana)	
28 Sep 2002	Jane Stevenson	Antonio Durán de la Motta (1675–1736)	"Fuego, fuego que el templo se abrasa"	
28 Sep 2002	Jane Stevenson	Juan Pérez Bocanegra	"Hanaq Pachaq"	
28 Sep 2002	Jane Stevenson	Schubert	"Gute Nacht" (no. 1 from Winterreise)	
28 Sep 2002	Jane Stevenson	Henry Purcell	"What Power Art Thou" (The Cold Genius from King Arthur, act 3, scene 2)	
28 Sep 2002	Jane Stevenson	John Field	Nocturne No. 10 in E minor	
28 Sep 2002	Jane Stevenson	Robert Johnson	"Come Palefaced Death"	
28 Sep 2002	Jane Stevenson	Roberto De Simone	"Villanella di Cenerentola" (from La Gatta Cenerentola)	
28 Sep 2002	Jane Stevenson	Thomas Campion	"My Sweetest Lesbia" (from A Book of Airs)	
5 Oct 2002	Anna Enquist	Bach	Sinfonia in F minor, BWV 795	
5 Oct 2002	Anna Enquist	Brahms	Cello Sonata in E minor, Op. 38 (2nd movement – Allegro quasi menuetto)	
5 Oct 2002	Anna Enquist	Britten	Pastoral & Nocturne (From Serenade, Op. 31)	
5 Oct 2002	Anna Enquist	Chopin	Studies in C major and A minor, Op. 10/1 and 2	
5 Oct 2002	Anna Enquist	W. A. Mozart	"Ah! Soccorso" (from Don Giovanni, act 1)	
5 Oct 2002	Anna Enquist	Robert Heppener	"A Girl" (from Four Songs on Poems by Ezra Pound)	
5 Oct 2002	Anna Enquist	Stravinsky	Symphony of Psalms (conclusion of 3rd movement)	
5 Oct 2002	Anna Enquist	W. A. Mozart	Quartet in D minor, K. 421 (1st movement – Allegro)	
12 Oct 2002	Noël Annesley	Bach	"Wir eilen mit schwachen, doch emsigen Schritten" (from Jesu, der Du meine Seele, BWV 78)	
12 Oct 2002	Noël Annesley	Beethoven	Sonata in F minor, Op. 57 – "Appassionata" (3rd movement – Allegro ma non troppo)	
12 Oct 2002	Noël Annesley	Gluck	"O del mio dolce ardor" (from Paride ed Elena, act 1)	
12 Oct 2002	Noël Annesley	Felix Mendelssohn	Octet in E♭, Op. 20 (opening of 1st movement – Allegro moderato ma con fuoco)	
12 Oct 2002	Noël Annesley	W. A. Mozart	Sonata for Piano and Violin in B♭, K. 378 (2nd movement – Andantino)	
12 Oct 2002	Noël Annesley	Schubert	Nähe des Geliebten, D. 162	
12 Oct 2002	Noël Annesley	Verdi	"Ella giammai m'amò!" (from Don Carlos, act 4)	
19 Oct 2002	Mike Figgis	Bach	Sarabande' From 'Cello Suite No. 6 in D'	
19 Oct 2002	Mike Figgis	Beethoven	Cavatina (5th movement) from String Quartet No. 13 in B♭	
19 Oct 2002	Mike Figgis	Billie Holiday	"Fine and Mellow"	
19 Oct 2002	Mike Figgis	Charles Ives	The Unanswered Question	
19 Oct 2002	Mike Figgis	Charlie Parker	"Lester Leaps In" (New York, 1952)	
19 Oct 2002	Mike Figgis	Kid Ory	"Savoy Blues"	
19 Oct 2002	Mike Figgis	Keith Jarrett	"Tribute"	
19 Oct 2002	Mike Figgis	Bach	"Wenn ich einmal soll scheiden" from St Matthew Passion	
26 Oct 2002	Kate Figes	Bach	Concerto for 2 Violins in D minor, BWV 1043 (3rd movement, Allegro)	
26 Oct 2002	Kate Figes	Bob Dylan	"Tangled Up in Blue"	
26 Oct 2002	Kate Figes	Chopin	Prelude in C, Op. 28, No. 1	
26 Oct 2002	Kate Figes	W. A. Mozart	Kyrie (from The Requiem, K. 626)	
26 Oct 2002	Kate Figes	Richard Strauss	Beim Schlafengehen (from The Four Last Songs)	
26 Oct 2002	Kate Figes	Schubert	Impromptu in A♭, D935, No. 2 (Op. Post. 142)	
26 Oct 2002	Kate Figes	Van Morrison	"Someone Like You"	
26 Oct 2002	Kate Figes	Bach	Contrapunctus Xiia & B from The Art Of Fugue (Invertible Fugue)	
2 Nov 2002	Sir Peter Hall	Beethoven	Diabelli Variations, Op. 120 (Variation 31 – Largo, Molto Espressivo)	
2 Nov 2002	Sir Peter Hall	Harrison Birtwistle	Earth Dances (excerpt)	
2 Nov 2002	Sir Peter Hall	Britten	Threnody (from Albert Herring, act 3)	
2 Nov 2002	Sir Peter Hall	Francesco Cavalli	"Vivi, vivi a'nostri amori" (from La Calisto, act 2)	
2 Nov 2002	Sir Peter Hall	W. A. Mozart	"Gente, gente, all'armi, all'armi" (from Le nozze di Figaro, act 4)	
2 Nov 2002	Sir Peter Hall	Arnold Schoenberg	Moses Und Aron (Conclusion)	
2 Nov 2002	Sir Peter Hall	Michael Tippett	Fantasia Concertante on a Theme of Corelli (Conclusion)	
2 Nov 2002	Sir Peter Hall	Al J. Neiburg, Doc Daugherty, Ellis Reynolds	"I'm Confessin' that I Love You"	
9 Nov 2002	Jane Gardam	Archangelsky	The Creed	
9 Nov 2002	Jane Gardam	Bishop Ken	"Awake, My Soul, and with the Sun"	
9 Nov 2002	Jane Gardam	Wingy Manone (c), Andy Razaf (w), Joe Garland (a)	"In The Mood"	
9 Nov 2002	Jane Gardam	Felix Mendelssohn	Quartet in A, Op. 13 (1st movement – Adagio – Allegro Vivace)	
9 Nov 2002	Jane Gardam	W. A. Mozart	Sinfonia Concertante in E♭, K. 247b (2nd movement – Adagio)	
9 Nov 2002	Jane Gardam	Robert Schumann	Glückes Genug + Wichtige Begebenheit + Träumerei (from Kinderszenen, Op. 15)	
9 Nov 2002	Jane Gardam	Traditional arr. Quilter	"Drink To Me Only"	
9 Nov 2002	Jane Gardam	Traditional Jamaican	Georgie Lyon	
16 Nov 2002	David Crystal	Laurie Anderson	O Superman (opening)	
16 Nov 2002	David Crystal	Ariel Ramírez	Kyrie (from Misa Criolla)	
16 Nov 2002	David Crystal	Victor Borge	"Caught in the Act"	
16 Nov 2002	David Crystal	Lonnie Donegan	"Rock Island Line"	
16 Nov 2002	David Crystal	Philip Glass	Powaqqatsi	
16 Nov 2002	David Crystal	Istvan Anhalt	Cento (opening)	
16 Nov 2002	David Crystal	Monteverdi	Sonata Sopra Sancta Maria (from Vespro Della Beata Vergine)	
16 Nov 2002	David Crystal	Michael Nyman	"Convening The Coven"	
23 Nov 2002	Colin Towns	Annie Lennox	"Thin Line Between Love and Hate"	
23 Nov 2002	Colin Towns	Britten	"The Storm" from Sea Interludes	
23 Nov 2002	Colin Towns	Debussy	Reverie For Piano	
23 Nov 2002	Colin Towns	Don Ellis Orchestra	Turkish Bath	
23 Nov 2002	Colin Towns	Dylan Thomas	"A Child's Christmas in Wales"	
23 Nov 2002	Colin Towns	Elgar	"Salut d'Amour"	
23 Nov 2002	Colin Towns	Miles Davis	"Blue in Green"	
23 Nov 2002	Colin Towns	Stravinsky	The Firebird	
23 Nov 2002	Colin Towns	Weather Report	Teen Town	
30 Nov 2002	Richard Strange	Bertolt Brecht and Kurt Weil and David Coulter	"The Ballad of Mack the Knife" (from The Threepenny Opera, act 1)	
30 Nov 2002	Richard Strange	Duke Ellington and Paul Francis Webster	"I Got It Bad and That Ain't Good"	
30 Nov 2002	Richard Strange	Gabriel Fauré	Sanctus (from The Requiem, Op. 48)	
30 Nov 2002	Richard Strange	Gavin Bryars	"Jesus Blood Never Failed Me Yet"	
30 Nov 2002	Richard Strange	Antonio Lauro	Dos Valses Venezolanos No. 1	
30 Nov 2002	Richard Strange	Liszt	Les Jeux d'Eaux de la Villa d'Este	
30 Nov 2002	Richard Strange	Puccini	Vissi D'Arte from Tosca	
30 Nov 2002	Richard Strange	Richard Strange	"You Will Die"	
30 Nov 2002	Richard Strange	Rodgers and Hart	Manhattan	
30 Nov 2002	Richard Strange	Wagner	Liebestod from Tristan and Isolde	
30 Nov 2002	Richard Strange	David Coulter	"How Do I Love Thee?" (from Intervention)	
7 Dec 2002	Nicholas de Jongh	Bach	Gigue from Suite in D major, BWV 1012	
7 Dec 2002	Nicholas de Jongh	Berlioz	"The Death of the Two Lovers" (from Roméo Et Juliette, Part 4)	
7 Dec 2002	Nicholas de Jongh	Mahler	Symphony No. 9 (end of Finale)	
7 Dec 2002	Nicholas de Jongh	W. A. Mozart	Piano Concerto No. 27 in B♭, K. 595	
7 Dec 2002	Nicholas de Jongh	Richard Strauss	Elektra (Final Pages)	
7 Dec 2002	Nicholas de Jongh	Schubert	String Quartet in D minor, D810, "Death and the Maiden" (Theme and Variation 1 from 2nd movement)	
7 Dec 2002	Nicholas de Jongh	Schubert	Sonata in A, D959 (1st movement Recap)	
7 Dec 2002	Nicholas de Jongh	Telemann	Concerto in A for Flute, Violin and Strings (from Tafelmusik, Series 1) 4th movement	
14 Dec 2002	Simon McBurney	Beethoven	Violin Concerto in D, Op. 61 (Cadenza and Conclusion of 1st movement)	
14 Dec 2002	Simon McBurney	Vincenzo Bellini	"Casta Diva" (from Norma)	
14 Dec 2002	Simon McBurney	John Cage	Sonata No. 5 (from Sonatas and Interludes)	
14 Dec 2002	Simon McBurney	Chopin	Study in C, Op. 10/1	
14 Dec 2002	Simon McBurney	Schnittke arr. Bashmet	Trio Sonata (Opening of 1st movement – Moderato)	
14 Dec 2002	Simon McBurney	Shostakovich	Gallop (from Hypothetically Murdered, Op. 31a)	
14 Dec 2002	Simon McBurney	Traditional American	"Mary Don't You Weep" (exc.)	
14 Dec 2002	Simon McBurney	Traditional Georgian	Gogo Shavtvala	
14 Dec 2002	Simon McBurney	Traditional Hebridean	"Mo Rùn Ailein"	
14 Dec 2002	Simon McBurney	Traditional Russian	"I Light The Fire"	
14 Dec 2002	Simon McBurney	Traditional Spanish	Alma Gitana	
21 Dec 2002	Peter Moores	Beethoven	Sonata in C, Op. 53 – "Waldstein" (2nd movement – Adagio Molto)	
21 Dec 2002	Peter Moores	Donizetti	"Coppia Iniqua" (from Anna Bolena, act 2, scene 3)	
21 Dec 2002	Peter Moores	Irving Berlin	"The Hostess With the Mostes' On the Ball" (from Call Me Madam)	
21 Dec 2002	Peter Moores	John Lennon and Paul McCartney	"Do You Want To Know A Secret"	
21 Dec 2002	Peter Moores	Puccini	In Questa Reggia (from Turandot)	
21 Dec 2002	Peter Moores	Richard Strauss	Marschallin's Monologue (from Der Rosenkavalier, act 1)	
21 Dec 2002	Peter Moores	Camille Saint-Saëns	"Softly Awakes My Heart" (from Samson and Delilah)	
21 Dec 2002	Peter Moores	Verdi	"It Can't Be!...Give Me Freedom To Be Happy" ("Sempre libera", from La traviata, act 1)	
21 Dec 2002	Peter Moores	Wagner	Brünnhilde's Battle Cry (from Die Walküre, act 2, scene 1)	
29 Dec 2002	Philip Franks	Bach	"All Is Fulfilled" (Es Ist Vollbracht, from St John Passion)	
29 Dec 2002	Philip Franks	Britten	"Sunday Morning" (from Peter Grimes, act 2)	
29 Dec 2002	Philip Franks	John Adams	Christian Zeal and Activity	
29 Dec 2002	Philip Franks	W. A. Mozart	"Bei Männern, welche Liebe fühlen" (from The Magic Flute, act 1)	
29 Dec 2002	Philip Franks	Henry Purcell	Chaconne (from King Arthur, act 5)	
29 Dec 2002	Philip Franks	Robert Schumann	Andante Cantabile (from the Piano Quartet in E♭, Op. 47)	
29 Dec 2002	Philip Franks	Shostakovich	Allegro molto (2nd movement of String Quartet No. 8 in C minor, Op. 110)	
29 Dec 2002	Philip Franks	The Beatles	You Never Give Me Your Money (Abbey Road)	

== 2003 ==
Date	Guest	Composer	Title	Performer / Label
4 Jan 2003	Sue Townsend	Bach	Prelude (from The Cello Suite No. 1 in G)	
4 Jan 2003	Sue Townsend	Beethoven	Violin Sonata in F, Op. 24 (Spring) 1st Movement, Allegro (Part)	
4 Jan 2003	Sue Townsend	Brahms	"Ihr habt nun Traurigkeit" (from A German Requiem)	
4 Jan 2003	Sue Townsend	Earl Hines	"There Will Never Be Another You"	
4 Jan 2003	Sue Townsend	Édith Piaf	"Lovers For A Day"	
4 Jan 2003	Sue Townsend	Jack Teagarden	A Hundred Years From Today	
4 Jan 2003	Sue Townsend	Shandileer	Happy – from The Soca Gold Vol 3 Album	
4 Jan 2003	Sue Townsend	Tchaikovsky	Finale of the Violin Concerto in D	
11 Jan 2003	Michael Gibbs	John Carisi	Springsville	
11 Jan 2003	Michael Gibbs	Debussy	Sonata for Flute, Viola and Harp (1st movement – Pastorale)	
11 Jan 2003	Michael Gibbs	Arthur Herzog Jr. and Billie Holiday	"Don't Explain"	
11 Jan 2003	Michael Gibbs	Charles Ives	The Unanswered Question (Revised Version)	
11 Jan 2003	Michael Gibbs	Olivier Messiaen	"Prière du Christ montant vers son Père" (from L'Ascension)	
11 Jan 2003	Michael Gibbs	Stravinsky	"Danse Sacrale" (from The Rite of Spring)	
11 Jan 2003	Michael Gibbs	Traditional music	"When The Saints Go Marching In"	
18 Jan 2003	James Mirrlees	Alexander Goehr	Su L'Orride Paludi + Sinfonia (From Arianna, Scene 6)	
18 Jan 2003	James Mirrlees	Beethoven	String Quartet in A minor, Op. 132 (last movement – Allegro appassionato)	
18 Jan 2003	James Mirrlees	Britten	Elegy (from Serenade For Tenor, Horn and Strings, Op. 31)	
18 Jan 2003	James Mirrlees	Monteverdi	"Pur ti miro" (from L'incoronazione di Poppea, act 3)	
18 Jan 2003	James Mirrlees	Arnold Schoenberg	Chamber Symphony No. 1, Op. 9 (conclusion)	
18 Jan 2003	James Mirrlees	Schubert	Fantasy in F minor, D. 940 (conclusion)	
18 Jan 2003	James Mirrlees	Stockhausen	Gesang Der Junglinge (opening)	
18 Jan 2003	James Mirrlees	Stravinsky	"The Birth of Apollo" (from Apollon Musagète)	
25 Jan 2003	Tim Winton	Arakel Siunetsi	Sirt Im Sasani	
25 Jan 2003	Tim Winton	Arvo Pärt	Summa	
25 Jan 2003	Tim Winton	David Howell Evans and Paul David Hewson and Adam Clayton and Larry Mullen Jr.	"I Still Haven't Found What I'm Looking For"	
25 Jan 2003	Tim Winton	Kelly Joe Phelps	Doxology	
25 Jan 2003	Tim Winton	Mclaughlin	Luki	
25 Jan 2003	Tim Winton	Peter Sculthorpe	"Djilile"	
25 Jan 2003	Tim Winton	Sonny Terry	"Sonny's Thing"	
25 Jan 2003	Tim Winton	Ralph Vaughan Williams	Symphony No. 5 in D (3rd movement – Romanza)	
1 Feb 2003	Steven Pinker	Aaron Neville and Joel Roux Neville – The Neville Brothers	"Yellow Moon"	
1 Feb 2003	Steven Pinker	Andy Statman	Flatbush Waltz (Conclusion)	
1 Feb 2003	Steven Pinker	Bach	Brandenburg Concerto No. 2 in F, BWV 1047 (1st movement – Allegro)	
1 Feb 2003	Steven Pinker	Elvis Costello	"God's Comic"	
1 Feb 2003	Steven Pinker	John Lennon and Paul McCartney	"She Said She Said"	
1 Feb 2003	Steven Pinker	Maurice Jarre	Herman (from the soundtrack of Enemies: A Love Story)	
1 Feb 2003	Steven Pinker	Oliver Nelson	"Stolen Moments"	
1 Feb 2003	Steven Pinker	George Shearing and George David Weiss (as B. Y. Forster)	"Lullaby of Birdland"	
8 Feb 2003	Elizabeth Jane Howard	Bach	Double Concerto in C minor, BWV 1060 (1st movement – Allegro)	
8 Feb 2003	Elizabeth Jane Howard	Brahms	Variations On The St Anthony Chorale (Variations 5, 6 & 7)	
8 Feb 2003	Elizabeth Jane Howard	C. P. E. Bach	Flute Concerto in A minor, Wq 166 (1st movement – Allegro assai)	
8 Feb 2003	Elizabeth Jane Howard	Domenico Scarlatti	Sonata In G, Kk 125	
8 Feb 2003	Elizabeth Jane Howard	W. A. Mozart	Horn Concerto No. 2 in E♭, K. 417 (3rd movement – Rondo)	
8 Feb 2003	Elizabeth Jane Howard	Richard Strauss	"Noch glaub' ich dem einen ganz mich gehörend" (from Ariadne auf Naxos)	
8 Feb 2003	Elizabeth Jane Howard	W. A. Mozart	Piano Concerto in B♭, K. 595 (3rd movement – Allegro)	
15 Feb 2003	Stephen Warbeck	Bob Dylan	"You Angel You" from Planet Waves	
15 Feb 2003	Stephen Warbeck	Hans Eisler	"Der Zerissene Rock" from Die Mutter	
15 Feb 2003	Stephen Warbeck	John Adams	"Short Ride In A Fast Machine"	
15 Feb 2003	Stephen Warbeck	John Parricelli and Martin France	"Shore Song" from Alba	
15 Feb 2003	Stephen Warbeck	Keith Jarrett	"All I Want" from The Mourning of a Star	
15 Feb 2003	Stephen Warbeck	Olivier Messiaen	"Louange à l'éternité de Jésus" from Quartet for the End of Time	
15 Feb 2003	Stephen Warbeck	The Pogues	"And the Band Played 'Waltzing Matilda'" from Rum, Sodomy and The Lash 8'06	
15 Feb 2003	Stephen Warbeck	Britten	"Canto con moto" from 3rd Suite for Cello, Op. 87	
22 Feb 2003	David Canter	Jean Françaix	Wind Quintet No. 1 (2nd movement – Presto)	
22 Feb 2003	David Canter	John Lennon and Paul McCartney	"She's Leaving Home"	
22 Feb 2003	David Canter	John Stafford Smith	"The Star-Spangled Banner"	
22 Feb 2003	David Canter	Ligeti	"San Francisco Polyphony"	
22 Feb 2003	David Canter	Luiz Bonfá	Manhã De Carnaval	
22 Feb 2003	David Canter	Giovanni Pierluigi Da Palestrina	Gloria (from Missa l'Homme Armé)	
22 Feb 2003	David Canter	Bach arr. Anton Webern	"Ricercar" (from The Musical Offering)	
1 Mar 2003	Sir Peter Ustinov	Berlioz	"La Spectre de la Rose" (from Nuits d'Été)	
1 Mar 2003	Sir Peter Ustinov	Antonio Maria Bononcini	Per la gloria d'adoravi (from Griselda)	
1 Mar 2003	Sir Peter Ustinov	Britten	"Sunday Morning" (from Peter Grimes, act 2)	
1 Mar 2003	Sir Peter Ustinov	Leoš Janáček	Organ Solo (from The Glagolitic Mass)	
1 Mar 2003	Sir Peter Ustinov	Moniusko	"The Wind Howls Among the Hills" (from Halka)	
1 Mar 2003	Sir Peter Ustinov	W. A. Mozart	"Il mio tesoro intanto" (from Don Giovanni, act 2)	
1 Mar 2003	Sir Peter Ustinov	Sergei Prokofiev	Violin Concerto No. 2 in G minor, Op. 63 (2nd movement, Andante assai)	
8 Mar 2003	Daniel Libeskind	Bach	Prelude and Fugue in F minor, BWV 881 (from The Well-Tempered Clavier, book 2)	
8 Mar 2003	Daniel Libeskind	Béla Bartók	String Quartet No. 5 (4th movement – Andante)	
8 Mar 2003	Daniel Libeskind	Beethoven	Sonata in C♯ minor, Op. 27/2 – "Moonlight" (1st movement – Adagio sostenuto)	
8 Mar 2003	Daniel Libeskind	Olivier Messiaen	"Sermon to the birds" (conclusion) (from Saint François d'Assise)	
8 Mar 2003	Daniel Libeskind	W. A. Mozart	A Musical Joke, K. 522 (1st Movement – Allegro)	
8 Mar 2003	Daniel Libeskind	Luigi Nono	Fragmente – Stille, An Diotima (exc.)	
8 Mar 2003	Daniel Libeskind	Ornette Coleman	Free Jazz (opening)	
8 Mar 2003	Daniel Libeskind	Thomas Tallis	Spem in Alium (Conclusion)	
8 Mar 2003	Daniel Libeskind	J. S. Bach	Suite in D minor, BWV 1008 (1st movement – Prelude)	
15 Mar 2003	Jon Lord	Bach	Transcribed: Elgar – "Fugue" from Fantasia and Fugue in C minor	
15 Mar 2003	Jon Lord	Béla Bartók	4th movement "Allegro Molto" from Music For Strings, Percussion and Celesta	
15 Mar 2003	Jon Lord	John Lennon and Paul McCartney	"Strawberry Fields Forever"	
15 Mar 2003	Jon Lord	Jon Lord	Third movement "Vivace-Presto" from Concerto for Group and Orchestra	
15 Mar 2003	Jon Lord	Miles Davis and Gil Evans	"Gone" From Porgy and Bess	
15 Mar 2003	Jon Lord	Stravinsky	Sacrificial Dance from The Rite of Spring	
15 Mar 2003	Jon Lord	Ralph Vaughan Williams	2nd movement from A London Symphony	
22 Mar 2003	Virginia Nicholson	Anonymous work	"La Cammesella"	
22 Mar 2003	Virginia Nicholson	Britten	Violin Concerto, Op. 15 (conclusion of 3rd movement – Passacaglia)	
22 Mar 2003	Virginia Nicholson	Georges Delerue	"Le Tourbillon" (from the film soundtrack of Jules et Jim)	
22 Mar 2003	Virginia Nicholson	George Gershwin	"Bess, You Is My Woman Now" (from Porgy and Bess)	
22 Mar 2003	Virginia Nicholson	Huey Smith	"Sea Cruise"	
22 Mar 2003	Virginia Nicholson	W. A. Mozart	"Et incarnatus est" (from Mass in C minor, K. 427)	
22 Mar 2003	Virginia Nicholson	Puccini	"Quando me'n vo'" (Musetta's Waltz from La bohème, act 2)	
22 Mar 2003	Virginia Nicholson	Stravinsky	The Firebird (Conclusion)	
22 Mar 2003	Virginia Nicholson	Traditional music	"The Water is Wide"	
29 Mar 2003	Andre Brink	André Brink	"The Other Side of Silence"	
29 Mar 2003	Andre Brink	Beethoven	Symphony No. 3 (Eroica): Finale: Allegro Molto	
29 Mar 2003	Andre Brink	Chopin	Prelude in D♭ major, Op. 28, No. 15 ("Raindrop")	
29 Mar 2003	Andre Brink	Dobar Vecer	Moja Draga (Good Evening, My Sweetheart)	
29 Mar 2003	Andre Brink	Françoise Hardy	Ce Petit Coeur	
29 Mar 2003	Andre Brink	Haydn	Von Deiner Güt', O Herr Und Gott ("Adam & Eve Duet", The Creation, Part 3)	
29 Mar 2003	Andre Brink	W. A. Mozart	"Dove sono" (from Le nozze di Figaro, act 3)	
29 Mar 2003	Andre Brink	Schubert	Nacht Und Träume D. 827	
29 Mar 2003	Andre Brink	W. A. Mozart	Sonata, K. 301, Allegro (2nd movement)	
5 Apr 2003	Toby Litt	J. S. Bach	Two and Three Part Inventions: No. 2 in C minor	
5 Apr 2003	Toby Litt	Bob Dylan	"I Dreamed I Saw St. Augustine"	
5 Apr 2003	Toby Litt	Charlie Parker	Koko'	
5 Apr 2003	Toby Litt	Camille Saint-Saëns	"Fossils" from Carnival of the Animals	
5 Apr 2003	Toby Litt	Schubert	"Die Krahe" from 'Winterreise', D911	
5 Apr 2003	Toby Litt	Stravinsky	"Here I Stand...." act 1, scene 1, The Rake's Progress	
5 Apr 2003	Toby Litt	Karel Kryl	Bratricku, Zavirej Vratka'	
5 Apr 2003	Toby Litt	Mahler	Wenn Dein Mutterlein Tritt zur tur Herein' Kindertotenlieder No. 3	
5 Apr 2003	Toby Litt	Morrissey/Marr	"Jeane"	
5 Apr 2003	Toby Litt	Nick Drake	Know'	
5 Apr 2003	Toby Litt	Thomas Adès	"O Albion" 6th Movement from Arcadiana Op. 12	
5 Apr 2003	Toby Litt	Traditional music	"Fifty Miles of Elbow Room"	
12 Apr 2003	Peter Brookes	Handel	Cara Sposa, Amante Cara (From Rinaldo)	
12 Apr 2003	Peter Brookes	Leoš Janáček	String Quartet No. 1 – "Kreutzer Sonata" (3rd movement – Con Moto)	
12 Apr 2003	Peter Brookes	Maxwell Davies	"Farewell to Stromness" (from The Yellow Cake Review)	
12 Apr 2003	Peter Brookes	W. A. Mozart	"Don Giovanni a cenar teco" (from Don Giovanni, act 2)	
12 Apr 2003	Peter Brookes	Shostakovich	String Quartet No. 8 in C minor, Op. 110 (1st and 2nd movements)	
12 Apr 2003	Peter Brookes	Stravinsky	"Gently, Little Boat" (from The Rake's Progress, act 3, scene 3)	
12 Apr 2003	Peter Brookes	Tchaikovsky	"V vashem dome!" (from Eugene Onegin, act 2, scene 1)	
12 Apr 2003	Peter Brookes	Tom Lehrer	"The Vatican Rag"	
19 Apr 2003	Matthew Parris	Arthur "Guitar Boogie" Smith	Duelling Banjos	
19 Apr 2003	Matthew Parris	Mackay Davashe	Lakutshn Ilanga	
19 Apr 2003	Matthew Parris	Gilbert and Sullivan	"The Sun Whose Rays" (from The Mikado, act 2)	
19 Apr 2003	Matthew Parris	Gounod	Judex (from Mors Et Vita)	
19 Apr 2003	Matthew Parris	Haydn	Violin Concerto in C, Hob Viia/1 (2nd movement – Adagio)	
19 Apr 2003	Matthew Parris	Meyerbeer	Mi Batte Il Cor.... O Paradiso (from L'Africaine)	
19 Apr 2003	Matthew Parris	Rossini	"Assisa a' piè d'un salice" (Willow Song from Otello, act 3)	
19 Apr 2003	Matthew Parris	Bedřich Smetana	Faithful Loving (from The Bartered Bride, act 1, scene 2)	
19 Apr 2003	Matthew Parris	Billy Taylor and Dick Dallas	"I Wish I Knew How It Would Feel To Be Free" (Pub. Westminster Music)	
19 Apr 2003	Matthew Parris	Traditional Ukrainian	"Moon In The Sky"	
26 Apr 2003	Stanley Wells	Berlioz	Fantasy On Shakespeare's The Tempest (from Lelio, Op. 14b)	
26 Apr 2003	Stanley Wells	Britten	The Lovers' Awakening (A Midsummer Night's Dream, act 3)	
26 Apr 2003	Stanley Wells	Martin Best	Who Is Sylvia? (from The Two Gentlemen Of Verona)	
26 Apr 2003	Stanley Wells	Schubert	Auflösung, D807	
26 Apr 2003	Stanley Wells	Schubert	Hark, Hark, The Lark (Horch, Horch, Die Lerch, D889)	
26 Apr 2003	Stanley Wells	Shakespeare	"O, what a rogue and peasant slave am I', from Hamlet, act 2, scene 2	
26 Apr 2003	Stanley Wells	Shakespeare	Sonnets 29 and 36	
26 Apr 2003	Stanley Wells	Thomas Adès	"L'Embarquement" and "O Albion" from Arcadiana	
26 Apr 2003	Stanley Wells	Thomas Arne	"Thou Soft-Flowing Avon"	
26 Apr 2003	Stanley Wells	Ralph Vaughan Williams	"Full Fathom Five" (from Three Shakespeare Songs)	
3 May 2003	Professor Malcolm Longair	Handel	"Scherza infida", act 2 from Ariodante	
3 May 2003	Professor Malcolm Longair	John Adams	Beginning of act 2, scene 2, from Nixon in China	
3 May 2003	Professor Malcolm Longair	Olivier Messiaen	Vingt Regards sur l'Enfant-Jésus, No. 10: "Regard de l'esprit de joie"	
3 May 2003	Professor Malcolm Longair	Oscar Peterson	Chicago Blues' from 'The Trio'	
3 May 2003	Professor Malcolm Longair	Wagner	"Muss ich dich so verstehn" from Tristan und Isolde, act 3, scene 1	
10 May 2003	Rick Moody	Chopin	Nocturne in B♭ minor. Op. 9/1	
10 May 2003	Rick Moody	Ervin Webb	I'M Goin' Home	
10 May 2003	Rick Moody	Robert Fripp and Brian Eno	"Wind on Water"	
10 May 2003	Rick Moody	Gilbert and Sullivan	"The Sun Whose Rays"	
10 May 2003	Rick Moody	Simon Jeffes and Geoffrey Richardson	"Sheep Dip"	
10 May 2003	Rick Moody	Meredith Monk	Gotham Lullaby	
10 May 2003	Rick Moody	Arvo Pärt	"Für Alina"	
10 May 2003	Rick Moody	Tchaikovsky	Valse Sentimentale, Op. 51/6	
10 May 2003	Rick Moody	Frank Zappa	Get Whitey	
17 May 2003	Benedict Allen	Alain Kounkou	Dansez	
17 May 2003	Benedict Allen	J. S. Bach	Recitative ("Da nahmen die Kriegsknechte"), Chorus ("Gegrüsset seist du, Jüdenkönig") and Chorale ("O Haupt voll Blut und Wunden") (St Matthew Passion, part 2)	
17 May 2003	Benedict Allen	Elgar	Cello Concerto in E minor, Op. 83 (Adagio, 3rd movement)	
17 May 2003	Benedict Allen	Richard Strauss	"The Presentation of the Rose" (from Der Rosenkavalier, act 2)	
17 May 2003	Benedict Allen	José Ramón Sánchez	Soy Cubana (Son Montuno)	
17 May 2003	Benedict Allen	Tchaikovsky	The Rose Adagio (Pas D'Action) (from The Sleeping Beauty, Op. 66)	
17 May 2003	Benedict Allen	Traditional from Papua New Guinea	Traditional (from Papua New Guinea)	
17 May 2003	Benedict Allen	Traditional Song from Mongolia	Song in Praise of the Altaï	
24 May 2003	James Wood	Bach	Sonatina (from cantata Gottes Zeit ist die allerbeste Zeit, BWV 106, – "Actus Tragicus")	
24 May 2003	James Wood	Beethoven	Sonata in E, Op. 109 (last movement – Andante Molto Cantabile Ed Espressivo)	
24 May 2003	James Wood	Brahms	Intermezzo in E♭, Op. 117/1	
24 May 2003	James Wood	Brahms	Piano Concerto No. 1 in D minor, Op. 15 (opening of 2nd movement – Adagio)	
24 May 2003	James Wood	William Byrd	"Agnus Dei" (from Mass for Four Voices)	
24 May 2003	James Wood	John Lennon and Paul McCartney	'The Fool On The Hill"	
24 May 2003	James Wood	Hubert Parry	Never Weather-Beaten Sail	
24 May 2003	James Wood	Thomas Tallis	O Nata Lux	
24 May 2003	James Wood	William Henry Harris	"Faire Is The Heaven"	
31 May 2003	John Banville	Britten	"Before Life and After" (from the song cycle Winter Words)	
31 May 2003	John Banville	Shostakovich	Fugue No. 16 in B♭ minor (from 24 Preludes and Fugues, Op. 87)	
31 May 2003	John Banville	Gabriel Fauré	Nocturne No. 12 in E minor, Op. 107	
31 May 2003	John Banville	Gerald Barry	Triorchic Blues	
31 May 2003	John Banville	Henry Purcell	Sound The Trumpet (from The Ode Come Ye Sons Of Art Away)	
31 May 2003	John Banville	Richard Strauss	Sextet From Capriccio	
31 May 2003	John Banville	Traditional music	2The Dear Irish Boy"	
7 Jun 2003	Tim Pigott-Smith	Astor Piazzolla	Libertango	
7 Jun 2003	Tim Pigott-Smith	Bach	Aria (from The Goldberg Variations)	
7 Jun 2003	Tim Pigott-Smith	Duke Ellington and Billy Strayhorn	"Brown Betty"	
7 Jun 2003	Tim Pigott-Smith	Georges Brassens	Chanson pour L'Auvergnat	
7 Jun 2003	Tim Pigott-Smith	John Lennon and Paul McCartney	"Golden Slumbers", "Carry That Weight", "The End" (from Abbey Road)	
7 Jun 2003	Tim Pigott-Smith	Mahler	Ich Bin Der Welt Abhanden Gekommen (From 5 Rückertlieder)	
7 Jun 2003	Tim Pigott-Smith	Puccini	The Death of Mimi (from La bohème, act 4)	
7 Jun 2003	Tim Pigott-Smith	Shakespeare	"Fear No More the Heat of the Sun" (from Cymbeline, act 4, scene 2)	
7 Jun 2003	Tim Pigott-Smith	Shakespeare	"Her Father Loved Me...Witchcraft I Have Used" (Othello, act 1, scene 3)	
7 Jun 2003	Tim Pigott-Smith	Sibelius	Violin Concerto (1st Movement, excerpt)	
14 Jun 2003	Lynne Reid Banks	Composer: Arieh Levanon, lyrics: Oded Avissar	Erev Ba	
14 Jun 2003	Lynne Reid Banks	J. S. Bach	Double Concerto in D minor, BWV 1043 (1st movement – Vivace)	
14 Jun 2003	Lynne Reid Banks	Leonard Bernstein	"O, Happy We" (from Candide)	
14 Jun 2003	Lynne Reid Banks	Chopin	Prelude in D♭, Op. 28/15 – "Raindrop"	
14 Jun 2003	Lynne Reid Banks	George Gershwin	"Bess, You Is My Woman Now" (from Porgy and Bess)	
14 Jun 2003	Lynne Reid Banks	Gian Carlo Menotti	"Papers! Papers!" (from The Consul, act 2, scene 2)	
14 Jun 2003	Lynne Reid Banks	music by Gene de Paul, lyrics by Johnny Mercer	"Jubilation T. Cornpone" (from the soundtrack of Li'L Abner)	
14 Jun 2003	Lynne Reid Banks	Schubert	"Auf dem Wasser zu Singen", D. 774	
14 Jun 2003	Lynne Reid Banks	Traditional, klezmer arrangement by the band Finjan	"I Wanna Fellow" (Ich viII a. chusin)	
14 Jun 2003	Lynne Reid Banks	Kurt Weill	"Speak Low" (from One Touch of Venus)	
21 Jun 2003	Terry Farrell	Beethoven	Allegro Molto e Vivace (Scherzo from Septet, Op. 20)	
21 Jun 2003	Terry Farrell	George Benjamin	Sudden Time (opening)	
21 Jun 2003	Terry Farrell	John Lennon and Paul McCartney	"I'm Looking Through You" (from Rubber Soul)	
21 Jun 2003	Terry Farrell	Monteverdi	Antiphon: Trinitate Venerata, Psalm 147: Lauda Jerusalem	
21 Jun 2003	Terry Farrell	W. A. Mozart	"Soave sia il vento" (trio from act 1, Così fan tutte)	
21 Jun 2003	Terry Farrell	Not Available	Kayranis	
21 Jun 2003	Terry Farrell	Rodgers and Hart	"Here In My Arms" (from Dearest Enemy, 1925)	
21 Jun 2003	Terry Farrell	Schubert	Adagio (2nd Movement from The Quintet in C, D956)	
21 Jun 2003	Terry Farrell	Traditional Music From Connemara	The Piper's Broken Finger	
28 Jun 2003	Sir Martin Rees	Beethoven	Quartet in E minor, Op. 59/2 (conclusion of 2nd movement – Molto adagio)	
28 Jun 2003	Sir Martin Rees	Bruckner	"Te Ergo, Quaesumus" (from Te Deum)	
28 Jun 2003	Sir Martin Rees	Handel	"Descend, Kind Pity" (from Theodora)	
28 Jun 2003	Sir Martin Rees	Haydn	In the Beginning + Now Vanish Before the Holy Beams (from The Creation)	
28 Jun 2003	Sir Martin Rees	Leoš Janáček	Organ Solo + Intrada (from Glagolitic Mass)	
28 Jun 2003	Sir Martin Rees	Mahler	"Urlicht" (from Symphony No. 2 in C minor – "Resurrection")	
28 Jun 2003	Sir Martin Rees	Rachmaninov	"Rejoice, O Virgin Mother of God" (from Vespers, Op. 37)	
28 Jun 2003	Sir Martin Rees	Robert Schumann	Piano Quintet in E♭, Op. 44 (3rd movement – Scherzo – Molto Vivace)	
28 Jun 2003	Sir Martin Rees	Traditional Mongolian	Two Xöömi Songs	
5 Jul 2003	Tim Parks	Bach	Jesus Bleibet meine Freude ("Jesu, Joy of Man's Desiring" from Herz und Mund und Tat und Leben, BWV 147	
5 Jul 2003	Tim Parks	Chopin	Waltz in G♭, Op. 70, No. 1	
5 Jul 2003	Tim Parks	John Dowland	"Now O Now I Needs Must Part"	
5 Jul 2003	Tim Parks	W. A. Mozart	"Aprite un po' quegli occhi" (from The Marriage of Figaro, act 4)	
5 Jul 2003	Tim Parks	Traditional Old English Folk Song	Queen Eleanor's Confession	
5 Jul 2003	Tim Parks	Paul Simon	"The Boy In The Bubble" (from The Cd Graceland)	
5 Jul 2003	Tim Parks	Satie	Gnossienne No. 1	
5 Jul 2003	Tim Parks	Vivaldi	Concerto in G major for 2 Mandolins (1st movement, Allegro)	
5 Jul 2003	Tim Parks	W. A. Mozart	"Aprite, presto aprite" (from The Marriage of Figaro, act 2)	
12 Jul 2003	Julian Bream	Chabrier	Idylle (from Suite Pastorale)	
12 Jul 2003	Julian Bream	Henry Creamer and Turner Layton	"After You'Ve Gone"	
12 Jul 2003	Julian Bream	Django Reinhardt	Improvisation	
12 Jul 2003	Julian Bream	John Dowland	"Stay, Time, Awhile Thy Flying"	
12 Jul 2003	Julian Bream	Manuel De Falla	Nana (from Seven Spanish Folk Songs)	
12 Jul 2003	Julian Bream	Gabriel Fauré	"Au Bord de l'Eau"	
12 Jul 2003	Julian Bream	Leoš Janáček	Piano Sonata 1. X. 1905 – "From The Street" (1st movement – The Presentiment)	
12 Jul 2003	Julian Bream	Stravinsky	Symphonies of Wind Instruments	
19 Jul 2003	Peter Gill	Bach arr. Anton Webern	Ricercar (from The Musical Offering)	
19 Jul 2003	Peter Gill	Boulez	Conduite (from Le Visage Nuptial)	
19 Jul 2003	Peter Gill	Josquin	Kyrie (from Missa L'Homme Armé Super Voces Musicales)	
19 Jul 2003	Peter Gill	Mahler	Nun Seh' Ich Wohl (from Kindertotenlieder)	
19 Jul 2003	Peter Gill	W. A. Mozart	Ruhe sanft, mein holdes Leben (from Zaïde)	
19 Jul 2003	Peter Gill	Henry Purcell	Sound the Trumpet (from Come Ye Sons Of Art)	
19 Jul 2003	Peter Gill	Rodgers and Hart	Manhattan	
19 Jul 2003	Peter Gill	Schubert	Seligkeit, D. 433	
19 Jul 2003	Peter Gill	Stravinsky	"The Tresses" (1st Tableau from Les Noces)	
26 Jul 2003	Amanda Craig	Bach	"Jesu, Joy of Man's Desiring"	
26 Jul 2003	Amanda Craig	Beethoven	"Mir ist so wunderbar" (from Fidelio, act 1)	
26 Jul 2003	Amanda Craig	Annie Lennox and Dave Stewart	"Sisters Are Doin' It for Themselves"	
26 Jul 2003	Amanda Craig	Felix Mendelssohn	A Midsummer Night's Dream – Overture, Op. 21	
26 Jul 2003	Amanda Craig	W. A. Mozart	"Aprite un po" (from Le nozze di Figaro, act 4)	
26 Jul 2003	Amanda Craig	Noël Coward	"Mad Dogs and Englishmen"	
26 Jul 2003	Amanda Craig	Stravinsky	Appearance and Dance of the Firebird (from The Firebird)	
26 Jul 2003	Amanda Craig	Traditional arr. Barlow	"I Had Four Brothers" arr. Barlow	
2 Aug 2003	Adrian Lester	Cole Porter	"I've Got You Under My Skin"	
2 Aug 2003	Adrian Lester	Elgar	Cello Concerto in E minor, Op. 85 (1st movement – Adagio/Moderato)	
2 Aug 2003	Adrian Lester	Harold Darke	"In The Bleak Midwinter"	
2 Aug 2003	Adrian Lester	Paul Simon	"Bridge over Troubled Water"	
2 Aug 2003	Adrian Lester	Stephen Sondheim	"These Are My Friends" (from Sweeney Todd)	
2 Aug 2003	Adrian Lester	Stevie Wonder	"As"	
2 Aug 2003	Adrian Lester	Vivaldi	"Nulla in Mundo Pax Sincera"	
9 Aug 2003	Richard Francis	Bach	Prelude and Fugue C♯, BWV 872 (The Well-Tempered Clavier, book 2)	
9 Aug 2003	Richard Francis	Beethoven	Piano Sonata in C, Op. 53 "Waldstein" (2nd movement, Adagio molto)	
9 Aug 2003	Richard Francis	Heinrich Ignaz Franz Biber	La Battaglia	
9 Aug 2003	Richard Francis	Bob Dylan	"Just Like a Woman"	
9 Aug 2003	Richard Francis	Charles Mingus	"Fables of Faubus"	
9 Aug 2003	Richard Francis	John Adams	Shaker Loops (last movement, A Final Shaking)	
9 Aug 2003	Richard Francis	W. A. Mozart	"Voi che sapete" (from The Marriage of Figaro, act 2)	
16 Aug 2003	James Fenton	Bach	St Matthew Passion, BWV 244 (conclusion)	
16 Aug 2003	James Fenton	John Cage	Sonata No. 5 (from Sonatas and Interludes)	
16 Aug 2003	James Fenton	Gluck	Di Questa Cetra In Seno (from Il Parnaso Confuso)	
16 Aug 2003	James Fenton	John Harle	"Hunting the Hare"	
16 Aug 2003	James Fenton	Mussorgsky	"In the Corner" (from The Nursery)	
16 Aug 2003	James Fenton	Sapo Perapaskero	The Return of the Magic Horses	
16 Aug 2003	James Fenton	Wagner	"In fernem Land" (from Lohengrin, act 3, scene 3)	
16 Aug 2003	James Fenton	Warren Zevon and Paul Muldoon	Macgillycuddy's Reeks	
23 Aug 2003	Orlando Figes	J. S. Bach	Violin Concerto in A minor, BWV 1041 (1st movement – Allegro moderato)	
23 Aug 2003	Orlando Figes	Jimmy Witherspoon	"Times Are Getting' Tougher Than Tough"	
23 Aug 2003	Orlando Figes	Mussorgsky	The Great Gate Of Kiev (from Pictures At An Exhibition)	
23 Aug 2003	Orlando Figes	Rachmaninov	Nunc Dimittis (from Vespers, Op. 37)	
23 Aug 2003	Orlando Figes	Schubert	Moment Musical in A♭, D. 780/6	
23 Aug 2003	Orlando Figes	Shostakovich	String Quartet No. 12 in D♭, Op. 133 (1st movement – Moderato)	
23 Aug 2003	Orlando Figes	Alexander Scriabin	Etude in D♯ minor, Op. 8/12	
23 Aug 2003	Orlando Figes	Traditional Russian arr. Pokrovsky	Porushka	
30 Aug 2003	Judith Flanders	Hindemith	Variation 3 – Phlegmatic (from The Four Temperaments)	
30 Aug 2003	Judith Flanders	John Adams	"A Final Shaking" (from Shaker Loops)	
30 Aug 2003	Judith Flanders	Monteverdi	"Nisi Dominus" (from Vespro Della Beata Vergine)	
30 Aug 2003	Judith Flanders	W. A. Mozart	Piano Concerto in D, K. 175 (3rd movement – Allegro)	
30 Aug 2003	Judith Flanders	Francis Poulenc	"Qui Sedes Ad Dexteram Patris" (from Gloria)	
30 Aug 2003	Judith Flanders	Alessandro Stradella	Volin'Pure Lontano Dal Sen' (from San Giovanni Battista)	
30 Aug 2003	Judith Flanders	Stravinsky	Coda – Apollo and the Muses (from Apollo)	
30 Aug 2003	Judith Flanders	Vivaldi	N'El Suo Carcere Ristretto(From Serenata A Tre)	
6 Sep 2003	David Hughes (novelist)	J. S. Bach	Fugue (from Fantasia and Fugue in G minor, BWV 542)	
6 Sep 2003	David Hughes (novelist)	Jake Thackray	Grandad	
6 Sep 2003	David Hughes (novelist)	Carl Nielsen	Clarinet Concerto, Op. 57 (1st movement – Allegretto Un Poco)	
6 Sep 2003	David Hughes (novelist)	Ravel	Forlane (from Le Tombeau de Couperin)	
6 Sep 2003	David Hughes (novelist)	Stanford	Magnificat in C, Op. 115	
6 Sep 2003	David Hughes (novelist)	Stravinsky	Octet (3rd movement – Finale)	
6 Sep 2003	David Hughes (novelist)	Traditional Swedish arr. Johansson	Folkvisor	
6 Sep 2003	David Hughes (novelist)	William Bolcom	Graceful Ghost (From Three Ghost Rags)	
13 Sep 2003	David Starkey	Thomas Campion	"It Fell on a Summer's Day"	
13 Sep 2003	David Starkey	Haydn	Gloria (from Nelson Mass)	
13 Sep 2003	David Starkey	Haydn	The Representation of Chaos (from The Creation)	
13 Sep 2003	David Starkey	Henry VIII	Pastyme With Good Companye	
13 Sep 2003	David Starkey	Monteverdi	"Pur ti miro, pur ti stringo" (from L'incoronazione di Poppea, act 2)	
13 Sep 2003	David Starkey	W. A. Mozart	"Dove sono" (from Le nozze di Figaro, act 3)	
13 Sep 2003	David Starkey	Henry Purcell	March (from Music for the Funeral of Queen Mary)	
13 Sep 2003	David Starkey	Verdi	"Dio, che nell'alma infondere" (from Don Carlos, act 2, scene 1)	
13 Sep 2003	David Starkey	W. A. Mozart	Oboe Quartet in F, K. 370 (2nd movement – Adagio)	
21 Sep 2003	John Simpson	Anton Goosen	"Om Te Breyten"	
21 Sep 2003	John Simpson	Béla Bartók	Stick Dance, Sash Dance + In One Spot (from Six Roumanian Folk Dances)	
21 Sep 2003	John Simpson	Berlioz	"Nuit d'ivresse" (From Les Troyens, act 4, scene 2)	
21 Sep 2003	John Simpson	Britten	Captain Vere's Monologue (from Billy Budd, act 2, scene 2)	
21 Sep 2003	John Simpson	John Gay	The Modes of the Court So Common Are Grown (from The Beggar's Opera)	
21 Sep 2003	John Simpson	Joe Grey and Leo Wood and Arthur Harrington Gibbs	Runnin' Wild	
21 Sep 2003	John Simpson	Sergei Prokofiev	"The Philosophers" (from Cantata for the 20th Anniversary of the October Revolution)	
21 Sep 2003	John Simpson	Henry Purcell	"Behold, Upon My Bended Spear" (conclusion of Dido and Aeneas, act 2)	
28 Sep 2003	Zoe Wanamaker	Bach	First movement of Partita No. 1 in B♭ major, BWV 825	
28 Sep 2003	Zoe Wanamaker	Leonard Bernstein	West Side Story: Prologue	
28 Sep 2003	Zoe Wanamaker	Jule Styne (music) and Bob Merrill (lyrics)	"Don't Rain On My Parade" from Funny Girl	
28 Sep 2003	Zoe Wanamaker	Mahler	Symphony No. 9 [end of the 1st movement, Andante Comodo]	
28 Sep 2003	Zoe Wanamaker	Mark Charlap (music) and Carolyn Leigh (lyrics)	"I'm Flying" from Peter Pan	
28 Sep 2003	Zoe Wanamaker	Puccini	Duet from the end of act 2 of Tosca	
28 Sep 2003	Zoe Wanamaker	Rodgers and Hart	"My Funny Valentine"	
28 Sep 2003	Zoe Wanamaker	Verdi	Requiem (Lacrymosa)	
5 Oct 2003	Michael Longley	Chopin	Nocturne in E♭, Op. 9/2	
5 Oct 2003	Michael Longley	George Gershwin	"I Loves You, Porgy"	
5 Oct 2003	Michael Longley	Charles Ives	"The Housatonic at Stockbridge" (from Three Places In New England)	
5 Oct 2003	Michael Longley	Leoš Janáček	The Cunning Little Vixen (conclusion of act 2)	
5 Oct 2003	Michael Longley	Shostakovich	Cello Concerto No. 1, Op. 107 (exc. from 3rd movement – Andantino)	
5 Oct 2003	Michael Longley	Sibelius	Symphony No. 5 in E♭, Op. 82 (3rd movement – Allegro molto)	
5 Oct 2003	Michael Longley	Thomas William Hanforth	Psalm 149	
5 Oct 2003	Michael Longley	Traditional music	The Lass From Killiecrankie	
5 Oct 2003	Michael Longley	Fats Waller and Andy Razaf	Lulu's Back in Town	
12 Oct 2003	Jane Smiley	Beethoven	Choral Fantasy, Op. 80	
12 Oct 2003	Jane Smiley	Donizetti	"Chi mi frena in tal momento" (sextet from Lucia di Lammermoor, act 2)	
12 Oct 2003	Jane Smiley	Jesse Fuller	"San Francisco Bay Blues"	
12 Oct 2003	Jane Smiley	W. A. Mozart	Quintet in C major, K. 515 (1st movement – Allegro)	
12 Oct 2003	Jane Smiley	Nitty Gritty Dirt Band	"The Turn Of The Century"	
12 Oct 2003	Jane Smiley	Traditional music	"Ashokan Farewell"	
12 Oct 2003	Jane Smiley	Traditional music	"Down to the River to Pray"	
12 Oct 2003	Jane Smiley	Traditional arr. Terry Sumsion	"Shenandoah"	
19 Oct 2003	Tom Courtenay	J. S. Bach	Suite No. 6 in D, BWV 1012 (1st movement – Prelude)	
19 Oct 2003	Tom Courtenay	Beethoven	Quartet In F, Op. 135 (3rd movement – Lento Assai, Cantate E Tranquillo)	
19 Oct 2003	Tom Courtenay	Chopin	Waltz in F minor, Op. 70/2	
19 Oct 2003	Tom Courtenay	Antonín Dvořák arr. Kreisler	Songs My Mother Taught Me	
19 Oct 2003	Tom Courtenay	Maschwitz and Jack Strachey	"These Foolish Things"	
19 Oct 2003	Tom Courtenay	W. A. Mozart	Divertimento in E♭, K. 563 (4th movement – Andante)	
19 Oct 2003	Tom Courtenay	Schubert	"Am See"	
19 Oct 2003	Tom Courtenay	Stephen Foster	"Jeanie With The Light Brown Hair"	
19 Oct 2003	Tom Courtenay	James Cavanaugh and Vincent Rose and Larry Stock	"The Umbrella Man"	
26 Oct 2003	Allen Jones	Morey Amsterdam and Arthur Sullivan and Baron	"Rum and Coca-Cola"	
26 Oct 2003	Allen Jones	J. S. Bach	Brandenburg Concerto No. 3 in G, BWV 1048 (2nd and 3rd movements)	
26 Oct 2003	Allen Jones	Louiguy and Édith Piaf	La Vie En Rose	
26 Oct 2003	Allen Jones	Puccini	"Che Il Bel Sogno di Doretta" (from La Rondine)	
26 Oct 2003	Allen Jones	Camille Saint-Saëns	"Mon cœur s'ouvre à ta voix" (from Samson et Dalila, act 2, scene 3)	
26 Oct 2003	Allen Jones	Traditional music	Make Me a Pallet on the Floor	
26 Oct 2003	Allen Jones	Traditional Irish	The March of the King of Laois	
26 Oct 2003	Allen Jones	Billy Wallace and Jimmy Rule	"Paying for that Back Street Affair"	
26 Oct 2003	Allen Jones	Traditional Japanese	"Geisha Song"	
2 Nov 2003	Mary Ann Sieghart	Brahms	"How Lovely Are Thy Dwellings" (Wie Lieblich Sind Deine Wohnungen from Ein Deutsches Requiem)	
2 Nov 2003	Mary Ann Sieghart	Domenico Cimarosa	Oboe Concerto	
2 Nov 2003	Mary Ann Sieghart	Hugh Masekela and Daly Gary and Timothy Michael	"Bring Him Back Home"	
2 Nov 2003	Mary Ann Sieghart	Jimmy McHugh and Dorothy Fields	"I Can't Give You Anything But Love"	
2 Nov 2003	Mary Ann Sieghart	W. A. Mozart	"Lacrimosa" (from Requiem, K. 626)	
2 Nov 2003	Mary Ann Sieghart	Otis Redding	"Try A Little Tenderness"	
2 Nov 2003	Mary Ann Sieghart	Richard Strauss	"September" (from Four Last Songs)	
2 Nov 2003	Mary Ann Sieghart	Wagner	Prelude to act 3 of Die Meistersinger von Nürnberg	
9 Nov 2003	Adam Thirlwell	Belle and Sebastian	Seymour Stein	
9 Nov 2003	Adam Thirlwell	Jacques Brel	"The Girls and the Dogs"	
9 Nov 2003	Adam Thirlwell	John Adams	Grand Pianola Music Part 3, On the Dominant Divide	
9 Nov 2003	Adam Thirlwell	Lutoslawski	Dance Preludes for Clarinet and Piano (First 3)	
9 Nov 2003	Adam Thirlwell	W. A. Mozart	"Per pietà, ben mio, perdona" (from Così fan tutte, act 2)	
9 Nov 2003	Adam Thirlwell	Stravinsky	"Exaudi Orationem Meam, Domine" (from Symphony Of Psalms)	
9 Nov 2003	Adam Thirlwell	Anton Webern	6 Bagatelles for String Quartet, Op. 9	
16 Nov 2003	Clare Morrall	Bach	2nd movement from Concerto for Violin and Oboe in C minor	
16 Nov 2003	Clare Morrall	Beethoven	Fourth Movement From Symphony No. 7	
16 Nov 2003	Clare Morrall	Chopin	Prelude No. 17 in A♭	
16 Nov 2003	Clare Morrall	Gilbert and Sullivan	"I Have A Song To Sing, Oh!" from Yeoman of the Guard	
16 Nov 2003	Clare Morrall	Handel	"Io t'abbraccio" from Rodelinda, act 2	
16 Nov 2003	Clare Morrall	Schubert	Impromptu D899 No. 1	
23 Nov 2003	Robin Dunbar	J. S. Bach	Fugue (from Toccata and Fugue in D minor, BWV 565)	
23 Nov 2003	Robin Dunbar	Lassus	Kyrie (from Missa Entre Vous Filles)	
23 Nov 2003	Robin Dunbar	Arvo Pärt	Magnificat	
23 Nov 2003	Robin Dunbar	Pérotin	"Viderunt omnes"	
23 Nov 2003	Robin Dunbar	Django Reinhardt and Grappelli	Billets Doux	
23 Nov 2003	Robin Dunbar	Joaquín Rodrigo	Concierto De Aranjuez (conclusion of 2nd movement -Adagio)	
23 Nov 2003	Robin Dunbar	Traditional music	Kali Kali Zulfon Ke Phande Nah Dalo	
23 Nov 2003	Robin Dunbar	Traditional Scottish arr. Capercaillie	"Iain Ghlinn' Cuaich"	
30 Nov 2003	Quentin Blake	Beethoven	Quartet in F, Op. 135 (4th movement – Grave Ma Non Troppo Tratto – Allegro)	
30 Nov 2003	Quentin Blake	Georges Brassens	Le Parapluie	
30 Nov 2003	Quentin Blake	Britten	"At The Railway Station, Upway" (from Winter Words, Op. 52)	
30 Nov 2003	Quentin Blake	John Dowland	"In Darkness Let Me Dwell"	
30 Nov 2003	Quentin Blake	Leoš Janáček	Quartet No. 2 – Intimate Letters (1st movement: Andante – Allegro)	
30 Nov 2003	Quentin Blake	Jacques Offenbach	"Oui, c'est un rêve" (from La belle Hélène, act 2)	
30 Nov 2003	Quentin Blake	Verdi	"Era la notte" and "Si, pel ciel" (from Otello, act 2)	
14 Dec 2003	Jill Balcon	Cole Porter	"I've Got You Under My Skin" or "Let's Do It"	
14 Dec 2003	Jill Balcon	Gabriel Fauré	Tarentelle, Op. 10, No. 2	
14 Dec 2003	Jill Balcon	Leoš Janáček	String Quartet No. 2 (Intimate Letters) (1st movement)	
14 Dec 2003	Jill Balcon	W. A. Mozart	Piano Concerto No. 27 in B♭, K. 595 (3rd movement)	
14 Dec 2003	Jill Balcon	Francis Poulenc	Sonata for Clarinet and Piano (3rd movement, Très Animé)	
14 Dec 2003	Jill Balcon	Schubert	Sehnsucht Der Liebe, D180	
14 Dec 2003	Jill Balcon	Schubert	Sonata for Piano in B♭ D960 (4th movement)	
14 Dec 2003	Jill Balcon	Traditional Irish	"Believe Me, If All Those Endearing Young Charms"	
14 Dec 2003	Jill Balcon	Ralph Vaughan Williams	Symphony No. 5 (Romanza)	
14 Dec 2003	Jill Balcon	Heitor Villa-Lobos	Etude No. 7	
28 Dec 2003	Joanna Lumley	Beethoven	"Mir ist so wunderbar" (quartet from act 1, scene 4 of Fidelio)	
28 Dec 2003	Joanna Lumley	Bernard Herrmann	Aria from Salammbo (from the score for Citizen Kane)	
28 Dec 2003	Joanna Lumley	Chopin	Berceuse Op. 57	
28 Dec 2003	Joanna Lumley	Jim Parker	"Business Women" (from album Banana Blush)	
28 Dec 2003	Joanna Lumley	Josef Strauss	Sphärenklange, Waltz Op. 235 (Music Of The Spheres)	
28 Dec 2003	Joanna Lumley	Otis Redding	"I've Been Loving You Too Long" (from the album Otis Blue)	
28 Dec 2003	Joanna Lumley	Rossini	Overture To Semiramide	

== 2004 ==
Date	Guest	Composer	Title	Performer / Label
4 Jan 2004	Sir John Meurig Thomas	César Franck	Last movement from Violin Sonata in A major	
4 Jan 2004	Sir John Meurig Thomas	Antonín Dvořák	First movement from Piano Trio in E minor	
4 Jan 2004	Sir John Meurig Thomas	Schubert	Ständchen D920	
4 Jan 2004	Sir John Meurig Thomas	W. A. Mozart	Presto' from Divertimento K. 136	
4 Jan 2004	Sir John Meurig Thomas	Not Available	Suo Gan	
4 Jan 2004	Sir John Meurig Thomas	Richard Strauss	"Beim Schlafengehen" from Four Last Songs	
4 Jan 2004	Sir John Meurig Thomas	Samira Said	"Youm Wara Youm"	
4 Jan 2004	Sir John Meurig Thomas	Sussex Carol	O Come All Ye Faithful	
4 Jan 2004	Sir John Meurig Thomas	Thomas L. Thomas	Cyfri'R Geifr	
11 Jan 2004	Rachel Kavanaugh	Berlioz	"Nuit paisible et sereine" (from Béatrice et Bénédict, act 1)	
11 Jan 2004	Rachel Kavanaugh	Alfredo Catalani	"Ebben? Ne andrò lontana" (from La Wally, act 1)	
11 Jan 2004	Rachel Kavanaugh	Duke Ellington and Billy Strayhorn	"The Star-Crossed Lovers" (from Such Sweet Thunder)	
11 Jan 2004	Rachel Kavanaugh	Frank Loesser	"Sit Down You're Rockin' the Boat" (from Guys and Dolls)	
11 Jan 2004	Rachel Kavanaugh	Handel	Zadok The Priest	
11 Jan 2004	Rachel Kavanaugh	Ravel arr. Hancock	Piano Concerto in G (2nd movement – Adagio Assai)	
11 Jan 2004	Rachel Kavanaugh	Tchaikovsky	Swan Lake (opening of act 2)	
18 Jan 2004	John Julius Norwich	Beethoven	"Mir ist so wunderbar" (from Fidelio, act 1)	
18 Jan 2004	John Julius Norwich	Monteverdi	Duo Seraphim (from Vespro Della Beata Vergine)	
18 Jan 2004	John Julius Norwich	W. A. Mozart	Bassoon Concerto in B♭, K. 191 (2nd movement – Andante ma adagio)	
18 Jan 2004	John Julius Norwich	Jack Norworth and Nora Bayes	"Shine On Harvest Moon"	
18 Jan 2004	John Julius Norwich	Rossini	Kyrie (from Petite messe solennelle)	
18 Jan 2004	John Julius Norwich	Schubert	Erlkönig, D. 328	
18 Jan 2004	John Julius Norwich	Verdi	"Già nella notte densa" (from Otello, act 1)	
25 Jan 2004	Marcus du Sautoy	Britten	Fanfare For St Edmundsbury	
25 Jan 2004	Marcus du Sautoy	Britten	"I Know A Bank" (from A Midsummer Night's Dream)	
25 Jan 2004	Marcus du Sautoy	Dorothy Ker	Solo For Cello	
25 Jan 2004	Marcus du Sautoy	Handel	"Revenge, Revenge, Timotheus Cries" (from Alexander's Feast)	
25 Jan 2004	Marcus du Sautoy	Leoš Janáček	Sinfonietta, Op. 60 (1stmovement – Allegretto)	
25 Jan 2004	Marcus du Sautoy	Olivier Messiaen	"Joie du sang des étoiles" (from Turangalîla-Symphonie)	
25 Jan 2004	Marcus du Sautoy	Richard Strauss	"Frühling" (from Four Last Songs)	
25 Jan 2004	Marcus du Sautoy	Shostakovich	Quartet No. 8, Op. 110 (2nd movement – Allegro Molto)	
25 Jan 2004	Marcus du Sautoy	Wagner	Prelude to Parsifal, act 1	
1 Feb 2004	Ross King	J. S. Bach	Concerto in D minor after Alessandro Marcello, BWV 974 (1st movement)	
1 Feb 2004	Ross King	Guillaume Dufay	Nuper Rosarum Flores	
1 Feb 2004	Ross King	Handel	Cara Sposa, Amante Cara (from Rinaldo)	
1 Feb 2004	Ross King	Isaac	"Quis Dabit Capiti Meo Aquam" (Lament on the Death of Lorenzo De Medici)	
1 Feb 2004	Ross King	Korngold	"Glück, das mir verblieb" (from Die tote Stadt, act 1)	
1 Feb 2004	Ross King	Giovanni Pierluigi Da Palestrina	Assumpta Est Maria	
1 Feb 2004	Ross King	Paolo Tosti	Ideale	
8 Feb 2004	Andrew Sachs	Bach	Allemande (from Suite No. 4 in E♭, BWV 1010)	
8 Feb 2004	Andrew Sachs	George Gershwin	Piano Concerto in F (3rd movement – Allegro Agitato)	
8 Feb 2004	Andrew Sachs	Górecki	Symphony No. 3 (opening)	
8 Feb 2004	Andrew Sachs	Jelly Roll Morton	"Wolverine Blues"	
8 Feb 2004	Andrew Sachs	Kozeluch	Clarinet Concerto in E♭ (2nd movement – Poco adagio)	
8 Feb 2004	Andrew Sachs	Rossini	"Una voce poco fa" (from The Barber of Seville)	
8 Feb 2004	Andrew Sachs	Paul Simon and Joseph Shabalala	"Homeless"	
8 Feb 2004	Andrew Sachs	Fernando Sor	Variations on a Theme of Mozart	
8 Feb 2004	Andrew Sachs	Stravinsky	Vivo (No. 4 from Quatre Études, Op. 7)	
15 Feb 2004	Lavinia Greenlaw	Bob Dylan	"Girl from the North Country" (from the album Nashville Skyline)	
15 Feb 2004	Lavinia Greenlaw	Earth Wind Fire and X	"That's The Way of the World"	
15 Feb 2004	Lavinia Greenlaw	Ian Wilson	Hamelin	
15 Feb 2004	Lavinia Greenlaw	Leoš Janáček	"Tot' Zrovna Jde!" (Jenůfa, end of act 2)	
15 Feb 2004	Lavinia Greenlaw	Kurtág	"In Memoriam Tamás Blum" (from Signs, Games and Messages)	
15 Feb 2004	Lavinia Greenlaw	Louis Armstrong and Billie Holiday	"Do You Know What it Means to Miss New Orleans?"	
15 Feb 2004	Lavinia Greenlaw	Reading – Lavinia Greenlaw	"Essex Rag" (from Minsk)	
15 Feb 2004	Lavinia Greenlaw	Shostakovich	Piano Quintet Op. 57, Prelude	
15 Feb 2004	Lavinia Greenlaw	John Tavener	Song: The Western Wynde	
15 Feb 2004	Lavinia Greenlaw	Wreckless Eric	Whole Wide World	
22 Feb 2004	Russell Taylor	Bach	Aria: Mache Dich Mein Herze Rein (St Matthew Passion)	
22 Feb 2004	Russell Taylor	Beethoven	Piano Sonata in F minor, Op. 57 ("Appassionata") 2nd movement	
22 Feb 2004	Russell Taylor	Chopin	Mazurka in F minor, Op. 68, No. 4	
22 Feb 2004	Russell Taylor	Duke Ellington and Billy Strayhorn	"Sonnet for Caesar"	
22 Feb 2004	Russell Taylor	George Gershwin	Concerto in F – Second Movement	
22 Feb 2004	Russell Taylor	John Lennon and Paul McCartney	"Julia" (from The White Album)	
29 Feb 2004	Michael Bywater	J. S. Bach	Organ Concerto in D minor, BWV 1059	
29 Feb 2004	Michael Bywater	Handel	"Crystal Streams" (from Susanna)	
29 Feb 2004	Michael Bywater	Hindemith	Organ Sonata No. 3 (3rd movement: So Wünsch' Ich Ihr)	
29 Feb 2004	Michael Bywater	Leoš Janáček	Pantomime (from The Cunning Little Vixen)	
29 Feb 2004	Michael Bywater	Ligeti	Volumina	
29 Feb 2004	Michael Bywater	Olivier Messiaen	"Regard de l'esprit de joie" (no. 10 from Vingt Regards sur l'Enfant-Jésus)	
29 Feb 2004	Michael Bywater	Monteverdi	"Chioma D'Oro" (from the 7th Book of Madrigals)	
29 Feb 2004	Michael Bywater	Praetorius	In Dulci Jubilo	
29 Feb 2004	Michael Bywater	Randy Newman	"I Want Everyone To Like Me" (from Bad Love)	
29 Feb 2004	Michael Bywater	Arnold Schoenberg	Gurrelieder (Introduction)	
7 Mar 2004	Shusha Guppy	Bob Dylan	"Love Minus Zero"	
7 Mar 2004	Shusha Guppy	Brahms	Sextet in B♭, Op. 18 (opening of 2nd movement – Theme and Variations)	
7 Mar 2004	Shusha Guppy	Chopin	Fantaisie-Impromptu in C♯ minor, Op. 66	
7 Mar 2004	Shusha Guppy	Debussy	"Mes longs cheveux descendent" (from Pelléas and Mélisande, act 3, scene 1)	
7 Mar 2004	Shusha Guppy	W. A. Mozart	"Recordare" (from Requiem Mass, K. 626)	
7 Mar 2004	Shusha Guppy	Payvar	"The Warmth of Your Eyes"	
7 Mar 2004	Shusha Guppy	Prévert and Vladimir Cosma	"Les Feuilles Mortes"	
7 Mar 2004	Shusha Guppy	Puccini	"Vissi d'arte" (from Tosca, act 2)	
7 Mar 2004	Shusha Guppy	Traditional music	"My Silver Gun"	
7 Mar 2004	Shusha Guppy	Schubert	Impromptu in G♭, D. 899/3	
14 Mar 2004	Anthony Lane	J. S. Bach	"Christe Eleison" (from Mass in B minor)	
14 Mar 2004	Anthony Lane	Brahms	Violin Sonata No. 1 in G, Op. 78, First Movement	
14 Mar 2004	Anthony Lane	Britten	Hymn To The Virgin	
14 Mar 2004	Anthony Lane	Debussy	"Danseuses de Delphes" (Préludes, book 1)	
14 Mar 2004	Anthony Lane	Gerald Finzi	Dies Natalis (2nd Movement, Rhapsody, "Will You See The Infancy")	
14 Mar 2004	Anthony Lane	George and Ira Gershwin	"They Can't Take That Away from Me"	
14 Mar 2004	Anthony Lane	Stravinsky	Petrushka (Shrove-Tide Fair and The Crowds from Scene 1)	
21 Mar 2004	Ray Dolan	Hank Williams	"Ramblin' Man"	
21 Mar 2004	Ray Dolan	Lightnin' Hopkins	"Trouble in Mind" (from Autobiography in Blues)	
21 Mar 2004	Ray Dolan	Liszt	Un Sospiro (from 3 Concert Studies, S144)	
21 Mar 2004	Ray Dolan	Manuel De Falla	Jota (from Suite Populaire Espagnole)	
21 Mar 2004	Ray Dolan	Joaquín Rodrigo arr. Gil Evans	"Concierto De Aranjuez" (from Sketches of Spain)	Miles Davis
21 Mar 2004	Ray Dolan	Sibelius	Symphony No. 5 in E♭ major, Op. 82 (3rd movement, Allegro molto)	
21 Mar 2004	Ray Dolan	Van Morrison	Country Fair (from Veedon Fleece) (1974)	
28 Mar 2004	Reg Gadney	Anton Karas	Third Man Theme	
28 Mar 2004	Reg Gadney	J. S. Bach	Concerto in F minor, BWV 1056	
28 Mar 2004	Reg Gadney	Vincenzo Bellini	O Rendetemi La Speme (from I Puritani)	
28 Mar 2004	Reg Gadney	Britten	Agnus Dei/"One ever hangs" (from War Requiem, Op. 66)	
28 Mar 2004	Reg Gadney	Edwin Eugene Bagley	National Emblem	
28 Mar 2004	Reg Gadney	Eugène Gigout	Toccata in B minor	
28 Mar 2004	Reg Gadney	Not Available	"Cuckoo Clock Dialogue" (from film The Third Man)	
28 Mar 2004	Reg Gadney	Mitchell Parish and Franco Migliacci	Volare	
4 Apr 2004	Richard Jones	Berlioz	Queen Mab Scherzo (from Romeo and Juliet, Op. 17)	
4 Apr 2004	Richard Jones	Charles Penrose	"The Laughing Policeman"	
4 Apr 2004	Richard Jones	Leoš Janáček	"Good Night!" (from On an Overgrown Path)	
4 Apr 2004	Richard Jones	Ligeti	Étude No. 4 – "Fanfares"	
4 Apr 2004	Richard Jones	Robert Maxwell and Carl Sigman	Ebb Tide	
4 Apr 2004	Richard Jones	Sergei Prokofiev	"Refreshments for the Guests" (from Cinderella, act 2)	
4 Apr 2004	Richard Jones	Ravel	Fanfare (from L'Éventail de Jeanne)	
4 Apr 2004	Richard Jones	Stravinsky arr. Crabb & Draugsvoll	Dance of The Puppets (from Petrushka)	
4 Apr 2004	Richard Jones	Tchaikovsky	Panorama (from The Sleeping Beauty, act 2)	
4 Apr 2004	Richard Jones	Wagner	Entrance of the Masters (from Die Meistersinger von Nürnberg, act 1)	
11 Apr 2004	Loyd Grossman	Albéniz arr. Yepes	"Rumores De La Caleta" (from Recuerdos De Viaje)	
11 Apr 2004	Loyd Grossman	Beethoven	Symphony No. 9 in D minor, Op. 125 (2nd movement – Molto vivace)	
11 Apr 2004	Loyd Grossman	Howlin' Wolf	Smokestack Lightnin'	
11 Apr 2004	Loyd Grossman	George Gershwin	"Rhapsody in Blue" (Conclusion)	
11 Apr 2004	Loyd Grossman	W. A. Mozart	"Kyrie" (from Coronation Mass, K. 317)	
11 Apr 2004	Loyd Grossman	Salif Keita	"Yele N Na"	
11 Apr 2004	Loyd Grossman	Shakira	Ojos Así	
11 Apr 2004	Loyd Grossman	Traditional music	Tammurriata Nera	
18 Apr 2004	Jane Lapotaire	Gregorio Allegri	Miserere	
18 Apr 2004	Jane Lapotaire	Anonymous work, 13th century	"Domna, Pos Vos Ay Chausida" (Lady, Since I Have Chosen You)	
18 Apr 2004	Jane Lapotaire	Édith Piaf	La Foule	
18 Apr 2004	Jane Lapotaire	Hubert Parry	"There Is An Old Belief" (Songs Of Farewell No. 4)	
18 Apr 2004	Jane Lapotaire	Schubert	Octet	
18 Apr 2004	Jane Lapotaire	Sibelius	Violin Concerto, 1st movement, Allegro Moderato	
18 Apr 2004	Jane Lapotaire	The Inkspots	"If I Didn't Care"	
18 Apr 2004	Jane Lapotaire	Traditional music	Wedding Song from Turkey (Istanbul) and Bosnia (Sarajevo) from Songs of Spanish Sephardic Jews	
18 Apr 2004	Jane Lapotaire	Ralph Vaughan Williams	"The Lark Ascending"	
25 Apr 2004	Geoffrey Hill	Anonymous work	Coventry Carol	
25 Apr 2004	Geoffrey Hill	Bach	"O Ewigkeit, du Donnerwort", BWV 513 (from the Notebook for Anna Magdalena Bach)	
25 Apr 2004	Geoffrey Hill	William Croft	Funeral Sentences (Opening)	
25 Apr 2004	Geoffrey Hill	David Jones	The Sleeping Lord (exc.)	
25 Apr 2004	Geoffrey Hill	Elgar	R. P. A. (Fifth Variation from Enigma Variations)	
25 Apr 2004	Geoffrey Hill	Geoffrey Hill	The Orchards Of Syon	
25 Apr 2004	Geoffrey Hill	Handel	"I Know that My Redeemer Liveth" (from Messiah)	
25 Apr 2004	Geoffrey Hill	Hugh Wood	"Sabrina Fair" (from Scenes From Comus)	
25 Apr 2004	Geoffrey Hill	John Stafford Smith	"The Star-Spangled Banner"	
25 Apr 2004	Geoffrey Hill	Mussorgsky	Gnomus (from Pictures at an Exhibition)	
25 Apr 2004	Geoffrey Hill	Traditional music	The Ash Plant; The Black-Haired Lass; Jenny Picking Cockles	
2 May 2004	Richard Evans	Bach	Prelude in C, BWV 547	
2 May 2004	Richard Evans	Hartmann	Concerto Funèbre (4th movement – Chorale – Slow March)	
2 May 2004	Richard Evans	Richard Strauss	"Im Abendrot" (from Four Last Songs)	
2 May 2004	Richard Evans	Domenico Scarlatti	Sonata in B minor, Kk 27	
2 May 2004	Richard Evans	Telemann	Der Stürmende Æolus + Der Angenehme Zephir + Ebbe und Flut (from Overture in C – Hamburger Ebb' Und Flut)	
2 May 2004	Richard Evans	Viktor Ullmann	Piano Sonata No. 6, Op. 49 (2nd movement – Allegretto grazioso)	
2 May 2004	Richard Evans	W. C. Handy	"St Louis Blues"	
2 May 2004	Richard Evans	Kurt Weill	Introduction and "Ballad of Mack the Knife" (from The Threepenny Opera)	
9 May 2004	Miranda Seymour	Beethoven	Piano Concerto No. 1 in C, Op. 15 (3rd movement – Rondo – Allegro)	
9 May 2004	Miranda Seymour	Britten	"Malo, Malo" (from The Turn of the Screw)	
9 May 2004	Miranda Seymour	Joseph Holbrooke	Piano Concerto No. 1 "The Song of Gwyn Ap Nudd"	
9 May 2004	Miranda Seymour	Michel Legrand	"Lola Song" (from the film Les Parapluies De Cherbourg)	
9 May 2004	Miranda Seymour	Sergei Prokofiev	Dance of the Oprichniks (from Ivan the Terrible)	
9 May 2004	Miranda Seymour	Traditional music	"Sometimes I Feel Like a Motherless Child"	
9 May 2004	Miranda Seymour	Traditional Cretan	Syrtos	
9 May 2004	Miranda Seymour	Maurice Yvain and Albert Willemetz and Jacques Charles	La Java	
16 May 2004	Martin Sixsmith	Béla Bartók	Piano Concerto No. 3 (Part of the slow, 2nd movement, Adagio Religioso)	
16 May 2004	Martin Sixsmith	Olivier Messiaen	Louange à l'éternité de Jésus (from Quartet for the End of Time)	
16 May 2004	Martin Sixsmith	Krzysztof Penderecki	Threnody for the Victims of Hiroshima	
16 May 2004	Martin Sixsmith	Richard Strauss	Metamorphosen	
16 May 2004	Martin Sixsmith	Arnold Schoenberg	String Quartet No. 2, Op. 10 (part of the fourth movement, "Sehr langsam")	
16 May 2004	Martin Sixsmith	Schubert	"Mut!" and "Die Nebensonnen" (from Winterreise)	
16 May 2004	Martin Sixsmith	Shostakovich	Symphony No. 15 (first movement, Allegretto)	
23 May 2004	Janet Street-Porter	Bach	Variations 14–16 (from Goldberg Variations, BWV 988)	
23 May 2004	Janet Street-Porter	Berlioz	Tuba Mirum (from Grande Messe Des Morts, Op. 5)	
23 May 2004	Janet Street-Porter	Donizetti	Mad Scene (Conclusion) (from Lucia Di Lammermoor)	
23 May 2004	Janet Street-Porter	Vince Guaraldi	"Cast Your Fate to the Wind"	
23 May 2004	Janet Street-Porter	Philip Glass	Les Soeurs (from La Belle et la Bête)	
23 May 2004	Janet Street-Porter	Rameau	Vaste Empire De Mers (from Les Indes Galantes, Première Entrée, Scene 2)	
23 May 2004	Janet Street-Porter	Billy Sherrill and Tammy Wynette	"Stand By Your Man"	
23 May 2004	Janet Street-Porter	Neil Tennant and Chris Lowe	"It's A Sin"	
23 May 2004	Janet Street-Porter	Traditional Irish arr. Britten	"The Salley Gardens"	
30 May 2004	Polly Devlin	Bach	Prelude from the Cello Suite No. 1 in G, BWV 1007	
30 May 2004	Polly Devlin	Beethoven	Cavatina (from String Quartet in B♭, Op. 130)	
30 May 2004	Polly Devlin	Haydn	Sonata No. 1: Father Forgive Them (from Seven Last Words)	
30 May 2004	Polly Devlin	Miles Davis	"So What" (from Kind of Blue)	
30 May 2004	Polly Devlin	W. A. Mozart	"Kyrie" from the Mass in C minor	
30 May 2004	Polly Devlin	Seamus Heaney and Paddy Glackin	The Given Note and The Fairy's Lament	
30 May 2004	Polly Devlin	Traditional music	"On Raglan Road"	
30 May 2004	Polly Devlin	Traditional music	"Standing in Yon Flowery Garden"	
6 Jun 2004	Alain de Botton	Bach	Prelude [and Allemende] from the Cello Suite No. 3 in C, BWV 1009	
6 Jun 2004	Alain de Botton	Handel	Worthy is the Lamb and Amen Chorus (from Messiah)	
6 Jun 2004	Alain de Botton	W. A. Mozart	Exsultate, jubilate, K. 165	
6 Jun 2004	Alain de Botton	J. S. Bach	"Agnus Dei" (from Mass in B minor, BWV 232)	
6 Jun 2004	Alain de Botton	Bach	Das Lamm, Das Erwürget Ist (Chorus from Cantata 21 Ich Hatte Viel Bekümmernis)	
13 Jun 2004	Gerda Flockinger	Philip Glass	November 25-Ichigaya (2nd Mvmt, String Quartet No. 3 Mishima)	
13 Jun 2004	Gerda Flockinger	John Cage	Suite For Toy Piano (movements 1 & 2)	
13 Jun 2004	Gerda Flockinger	Richard Strauss	Beim Schlafengehen (Vier Letzte Lieder)	
13 Jun 2004	Gerda Flockinger	Shostakovich	Piano Quintet in G minor, Op. 57 (3rd movement – Scherzo)	
13 Jun 2004	Gerda Flockinger	Billy Strange and Mac Davis	"A Little Less Conversation" (Extended Remix – Part)	
13 Jun 2004	Gerda Flockinger	Rachid Taha and Khaled and Faudel	"Menfi"	
13 Jun 2004	Gerda Flockinger	Tchaikovsky	"Dialogue" (Piano Pieces Op. 72 No. 8)	
13 Jun 2004	Gerda Flockinger	Traditional music	"Tabhari Dom Do Lámg" (Give Me Your Hand)	
13 Jun 2004	Gerda Flockinger	Traditional arr. Jimmie Macgregor	"Heil-Ya-Ho, Boys" (The Mingalay Boat Song)	
13 Jun 2004	Gerda Flockinger	Vivaldi	Concerto in C major RV 558 for multiple instruments – (1st movement Allegro molto)	
13 Jun 2004	Gerda Flockinger	Kurt Weill and Bertolt Brecht	"Eifersuchtsduett" ("Jealousy Duet" from The Threepenny Opera)	
20 Jun 2004	Timothy West	Dory Previn	"Play It Again, Sam" (from Reflections In A Mud Puddle)	
20 Jun 2004	Timothy West	André Grétry	Zémir Et Azor – Pantomime	
20 Jun 2004	Timothy West	Marin Marais	Le Basque	
20 Jun 2004	Timothy West	W. A. Mozart	Rondo (from Serenade in B♭ for 13 Wind Instruments, K. 361)	
20 Jun 2004	Timothy West	Francis Poulenc	Piano Concerto (3rd movement, Rondeau À La Francaise)	
20 Jun 2004	Timothy West	Rachmaninov	"Only Begotten Son" (from The Liturgy Of St John Chrysostom)	
20 Jun 2004	Timothy West	Robert Schumann	Mondnacht (from Liederkreis, Op. 39)	
20 Jun 2004	Timothy West	Sonny Rollins	St Thomas	
20 Jun 2004	Timothy West	Verdi	Willow Song (from Otello, act 4)	
27 Jun 2004	Francis Wheen	Andrew Poppy	Do You Doubt? (Ophelia)	
27 Jun 2004	Francis Wheen	Bach	Goldberg Variations (Theme and 1st Variation)	
27 Jun 2004	Francis Wheen	Girolamo Frescobaldi	Toccata Chromaticha Per L'Elevatione	
27 Jun 2004	Francis Wheen	W. A. Mozart	"Dalla sua pace" (act 1, Don Giovanni)	
27 Jun 2004	Francis Wheen	Henry Purcell	"When I Am Laid in Earth" (Dido and Aeneas)	
27 Jun 2004	Francis Wheen	Traditional Richard Thompson	Dundee Hornpipe/Poppy-Leaf Hornpipe	
27 Jun 2004	Francis Wheen	Joaquín Rodrigo arr. Gil Evans	Adagio from Concierto De Aranjuez (Sketches Of Spain)	Miles Davis
27 Jun 2004	Francis Wheen	Arthur Sullivan	"When All Night Long a Chap Remains" (act 2, no. 1 Iolanthe)	
11 Jul 2004	Kevin Crossley-Holland	Anonymous work 13th century	"In Dulci Jubilo"	
11 Jul 2004	Kevin Crossley-Holland	Anonymous work	"La Quinte Estampie Real"	
11 Jul 2004	Kevin Crossley-Holland	Britten	Quartet of Swedes, Western Union Boy's Song and Cooks' Duet (from Paul Bunyan, act 1, scene 1)	
11 Jul 2004	Kevin Crossley-Holland	Kevin Crossley-Holland	"The Nightingales"	
11 Jul 2004	Kevin Crossley-Holland	Leoš Janáček	String Quartet No. 1, 1st movement, Adagio – Con Moto (Kreutzer Sonata)	
11 Jul 2004	Kevin Crossley-Holland	W. A. Mozart	Quintet and chorus "Di scrivermi ogni giorno" (Così fan tutte, act 1)	
11 Jul 2004	Kevin Crossley-Holland	Carl Nielsen	"Springtime in Funen and the Day, With Sun" (from Springtime in Funen)	
11 Jul 2004	Kevin Crossley-Holland	Ralph Vaughan Williams	Fantasia on a Theme by Thomas Tallis	
11 Jul 2004	Kevin Crossley-Holland	Walther Von Der Vögelweide	Palästinalied	
18 Jul 2004	David McKie	Béla Bartókovemenvt – Andante Tranquillo)		
18 Jul 2004	David McKie	Beethoven	Sonata in A♭, Op. 110 (1st movement – Moderato cantabile molto espressivo)	
18 Jul 2004	David McKie	Britten	"Midnight on the Great Western" (from Winter Words, Op. 52)	
18 Jul 2004	David McKie	Chopin	Polonaise in A♭, Op. 53	
18 Jul 2004	David McKie	Clark Terry	Mumbles	
18 Jul 2004	David McKie	Haydn	Piano Trio in G, Hob. XV/15 (Finale – Allegro Moderato)	
18 Jul 2004	David McKie	Ravel	Violin Sonata (2nd movement – Blues: Moderato)	
25 Jul 2004	Ed Smith	Bach	Prelude from the Suite No. 1 in G major for cello	
25 Jul 2004	Ed Smith	Beethoven	Piano Concerto No. 5 in E♭, Op. 73 ("Emperor") (2nd movement, Adagio un poco mosso)	
25 Jul 2004	Ed Smith	Bob Dylan	"Most of the Time" (from album Oh Mercy)	
25 Jul 2004	Ed Smith	Bruce Springsteen	"Born To Run"	
25 Jul 2004	Ed Smith	Schubert	Quintet in A, D667 (The Trout) (from the 1st movement, Allegro Vivace)	
25 Jul 2004	Ed Smith	Wagner	Liebestod (from Tristan and Isolde)	
25 Jul 2004	Ed Smith	Wagner	Prelude To Lohengrin	
1 Aug 2004	Kate Adie	Max Bruch	Violin Concerto No. 1 in G minor, Op. 26 (2nd movement – Adagio)	
1 Aug 2004	Kate Adie	Carl Michael Bellman	Fjäriln Vingad Syns På Haga	
1 Aug 2004	Kate Adie	Gilbert and Sullivan	"We're Called Gondolieri" (from The Gondoliers)	
1 Aug 2004	Kate Adie	Puccini	La bohème (opening of act 2)	
1 Aug 2004	Kate Adie	Text is attributed to Demetrius I of Georgia. The composer of the music is unknown	Shen Khar Venakhi	
1 Aug 2004	Kate Adie	Shostakovich	Waltz (from Jazz Suite No. 1)	
1 Aug 2004	Kate Adie	Ralph Vaughan Williams	Folk Songs from Somerset (from English Folk Song Suite)	
1 Aug 2004	Kate Adie	Wagner	Siegfried Idyll (Opening)	
8 Aug 2004	Edwin Thomas	Anne Dudley	Jeeves and Wooster (from the TV series)	
8 Aug 2004	Edwin Thomas	Antonín Dvořák	Symphony No. 9 in E minor – "From the New World" (4th movement – Allegro con fuoco)	
8 Aug 2004	Edwin Thomas	Herbert Howells	Here is the Little Door	
8 Aug 2004	Edwin Thomas	Maurice Jarre	Overture – Lawrence Of Arabia (from the Original Soundtrack)	
8 Aug 2004	Edwin Thomas	W. A. Mozart	Divertimento in D, K. 136 (1st movement – Allegro)	
8 Aug 2004	Edwin Thomas	Natalie Merchant	"This House is on Fire" (from the album Motherland)	
8 Aug 2004	Edwin Thomas	Carl Maria von Weber	"Schütze, der im Dunkeln wacht" (from Der Freischütz, act 2)	
22 Aug 2004	Gillian Slovo	Abdullah Ibrahim	"Mannenberg	
22 Aug 2004	Gillian Slovo	Arvo Pärt	Tabula Rasa (excerpt)	
22 Aug 2004	Gillian Slovo	Mafikizolo	Marabi	
22 Aug 2004	Gillian Slovo	Oscar Hammerstein II and Jerome Kern	"Ol' Man River" (from Showboat)	
22 Aug 2004	Gillian Slovo	Otis Redding	"Respect"	
22 Aug 2004	Gillian Slovo	Shostakovich	Symphony No. 7, The Leningrad (excerpt from 3rd movement, Adagio)	
29 Aug 2004	Michael Rosen	Beethoven	Symphony No. 6 in F, Op. 68 – "Pastoral" (3rd movement – Peasants' Merrymaking)	
29 Aug 2004	Michael Rosen	Billy Pigg	The Wild Hills of Wannies; J. R. Pigg; Dargai	
29 Aug 2004	Michael Rosen	Georges Brassens	"Le Parapluie"	
29 Aug 2004	Michael Rosen	César Franck	Violin Sonata in A (4th movement – Allegretto Poco Mosso)	
29 Aug 2004	Michael Rosen	Léo Ferré	Paname	
29 Aug 2004	Michael Rosen	Martin Luther	Ein Feste Burg ist Unser Gott	
29 Aug 2004	Michael Rosen	Miles Davis	"Freddie Freeloader" (from Kind of Blue)	
29 Aug 2004	Michael Rosen	W. A. Mozart	"Non più andrai" (from Le nozze di Figaro, act 1)	
5 Sep 2004	Ian Jack	Beethoven	Violin Sonata in A, Op. 47- "Kreutzer" (1st movement Conclusion – Presto)	
5 Sep 2004	Ian Jack	Jerome Kern	"I Still Suits Me" (from Showboat)	
5 Sep 2004	Ian Jack	Sam M. Lewis/ Joe Young and Con Conrad and J. Russel Robinson	"Singin' the Blues"	
5 Sep 2004	Ian Jack	Ewan MacColl	"The Shoals of Herring"	
5 Sep 2004	Ian Jack	Schubert	"An die Musik"	
5 Sep 2004	Ian Jack	Traditional Indian	Calamela	
5 Sep 2004	Ian Jack	Verdi	"Ehi! Taverniere!" (from Falstaff, act 3, scene 1)	
5 Sep 2004	Ian Jack	John Watt	The Kelty Clippie	
12 Sep 2004	Hugo Morley-Fletcher	Beethoven	Piano Trio in B♭, Op. 97 ("Archduke") (2nd movement, Scherzo: Allegro)	
12 Sep 2004	Hugo Morley-Fletcher	Bruckner	Symphony No. 7 in E (part of the finale)	
12 Sep 2004	Hugo Morley-Fletcher	Haydn	String Quartet In C, Op. 76/3 (Emperor) (1st Movement, Allegro)	
12 Sep 2004	Hugo Morley-Fletcher	Pietro Mascagni	The Easter Hymn (from Cavalleria Rusticana)	
12 Sep 2004	Hugo Morley-Fletcher	Monteverdi	"Non morir, Seneca" (from L'incoronazione di Poppea, act 1)	
12 Sep 2004	Hugo Morley-Fletcher	W. A. Mozart	Trio for Clarinet, Viola and Piano in E♭, K. 498 ("Kegelstatt")	
12 Sep 2004	Hugo Morley-Fletcher	Vivaldi	Oboe Concerto in D minor, K454 (1st movement, Allegro)	
12 Sep 2004	Hugo Morley-Fletcher	Wagner	Tannhäuser Overture	
12 Sep 2004	Hugo Morley-Fletcher	Beethoven	String Quartet in C♯ minor, Op. 131 (1st movement, Adagio ma non troppo e molto espressivo)	
19 Sep 2004	Jenny Agutter	Amy Beach	Theme and Variations For Flute and String Quartet, Op. 80 (Last Variation)	
19 Sep 2004	Jenny Agutter	Leonard Bernstein	Scherzo (from The Symphonic Dances from West Side Story)	
19 Sep 2004	Jenny Agutter	Brahms	Piano Concerto No. 2 in B♭, Op. 83 (4th movement, Allegretto grazioso)	
19 Sep 2004	Jenny Agutter	Elgar	In Haven (Capri) (from Sea Pictures)	
19 Sep 2004	Jenny Agutter	Heinrich Schütz	O Jesu, Nomen Dulce, Swv 308	
19 Sep 2004	Jenny Agutter	Monteverdi	Lauda Jerusalem (from The Vespro Della Beata Virgine)	
19 Sep 2004	Jenny Agutter	Paul Reade	"The Victorian Kitchen Garden"	
19 Sep 2004	Jenny Agutter	Schubert	Impromptu in F minor, D935, No. 1	
19 Sep 2004	Jenny Agutter	Shostakovich	Prelude and Fugue No. 23	
26 Sep 2004	Mark Tully	Alan Hovhaness	Majnun Symphony (Part One: Majnun)	
26 Sep 2004	Mark Tully	Bruckner	Te Deum (First Section, Allegro)	
26 Sep 2004	Mark Tully	Hymn	O Come, O Come, Emmanuel	
26 Sep 2004	Mark Tully	John Tavener	"Song For Athene"	
26 Sep 2004	Mark Tully	Percy Grainger	Londonderry Air ("Danny Boy")	
26 Sep 2004	Mark Tully	Schubert	Symphony No. 8 in B minor (opening of the 1st movement, Allegro moderato)	
26 Sep 2004	Mark Tully	Traditional music	Raga: Bahar	
26 Sep 2004	Mark Tully	Nusrat Fateh Ali Khan	"Allah Hoo"	
3 Oct 2004	Dame Judi Dench	Bach	Brandenburg Concerto No. 1 (3rd movement)	
3 Oct 2004	Dame Judi Dench	Leonard Bernstein	Psalm 23 and Psalm 2 (Vv 1–4) (from Chichester Psalms)	
3 Oct 2004	Dame Judi Dench	John Rutter	What Sweeter Music	
3 Oct 2004	Dame Judi Dench	Maxwell Davies	An Orkney Wedding, With Sunrise	
3 Oct 2004	Dame Judi Dench	Miles Davis	"Blue in Green" from Kind of Blue	
3 Oct 2004	Dame Judi Dench	Rachmaninov	Piano Concerto No. 3 in D minor, Op. 30 (opening of the 1st movement, Allegro ma non tanto)	
3 Oct 2004	Dame Judi Dench	Shakespeare	"When In Disgrace With Fortune and Men's Eyes" (Sonnet 29)	
3 Oct 2004	Dame Judi Dench	Stravinsky	The Rite of Spring (opening)	
10 Oct 2004	Antony Beevor	Brahms	Sonata No. 2 for Cello and Piano in F major, Op. 99 (2nd movement, Adagio affetuoso)	
10 Oct 2004	Antony Beevor	Arcangelo Corelli	Sonata For Trumpet, 2 Violins and Continuo in D	
10 Oct 2004	Antony Beevor	Francesco Manfredini	Concerto for 2 Trumpets in D major (1st movement)	
10 Oct 2004	Antony Beevor	Haydn	String Quartet in C, Op. 76, No. 3 (Emperor) (2nd movement, Poco Adagio: Cantabile)	
10 Oct 2004	Antony Beevor	Lev Knipper	Song of the Plains	
10 Oct 2004	Antony Beevor	Lev Knipper	Symphony No. 4 in D, Op. 41 (opening of 1st movement)	
10 Oct 2004	Antony Beevor	W. A. Mozart	"Bravo, signor padrone!...Se vuol ballare" (from Le nozze di Figaro, act 1)	
10 Oct 2004	Antony Beevor	Vivaldi	"Suscitans a Terra Inopem" (from Laudate Pueri Rv601)	
17 Oct 2004	Daniel Mason	Bach	Chaconne (from Partita in D minor, BWV 1004)	
17 Oct 2004	Daniel Mason	Samuel Barber	Adagio for Strings	
17 Oct 2004	Daniel Mason	Daniel Mason	The Piano Tuner (Exc.)	
17 Oct 2004	Daniel Mason	Antonín Dvořák	Bagatelle, Op. 9/1	
17 Oct 2004	Daniel Mason	Haydn	Sonata No. 50 in D, Hob. XVi/37 (1st movement – Allegro Con Brio)	
17 Oct 2004	Daniel Mason	Mahler	Symphony No. 6 (opening of 1st movement)	
17 Oct 2004	Daniel Mason	Bach	English Suite No. 2 in A minor, BWV 807 (1st movement – Prelude)	
17 Oct 2004	Daniel Mason	Bach	Prelude in F♯ minor (from The Well-Tempered Clavier, book 2)	
24 Oct 2004	Christina Coker	Beethoven	Quartet in C♯ minor, Op. 131 (5th movement – Presto)	
24 Oct 2004	Christina Coker	George Benjamin	Invention I (from Three Inventions For Chamber Orchestra)	
24 Oct 2004	Christina Coker	John Farmer	"Fair Phyllis"	
24 Oct 2004	Christina Coker	Orlando Gibbons	"The Silver Swan"	
24 Oct 2004	Christina Coker	Irving Berlin	"Let Yourself Go"	
24 Oct 2004	Christina Coker	Julian Joseph	"Ode To the Time Our Memories Forgot"	
24 Oct 2004	Christina Coker	Ladysmith Black Mambazo	"Dlondlobalo Njalo"	
24 Oct 2004	Christina Coker	Felix Mendelssohn	Song Without Words in D, Op. 109	
24 Oct 2004	Christina Coker	Stravinsky	Sacrificial Dance (from The Rite of Spring)	
31 Oct 2004	Harrison Birtwistle	Boulez	Improvisation sur Mallarmé II – "Une Dentelle S'Abolit" (from Pli Selon Pli)	
31 Oct 2004	Harrison Birtwistle	Debussy	Prélude À L'Après-Midi d'un Faune	
31 Oct 2004	Harrison Birtwistle	Roy Orbison	"In Dreams"	
31 Oct 2004	Harrison Birtwistle	Giovanni Pierluigi Da Palestrina	"Si Ignoras Te"	
31 Oct 2004	Harrison Birtwistle	Ravi Shankar	Yaman Kalyan	
31 Oct 2004	Harrison Birtwistle	Stravinsky	Symphonies of Wind Instruments	
7 Nov 2004	Simon Goldhill	Thomas Adès	"So That Is All" (from Powder Her Face, act 2, scene 6)	
7 Nov 2004	Simon Goldhill	Beethoven	Quartet in C♯ minor, Op. 131 (1st movement – Adagio ma non troppo e molto espressivo)	
7 Nov 2004	Simon Goldhill	John Blow	"Ah, Heav'n! What Is't I Hear?"	
7 Nov 2004	Simon Goldhill	Handel	Dixit Dominus (Opening Chorus)	
7 Nov 2004	Simon Goldhill	Richard Strauss	"Allein! Weh, Ganz Allein" (from Elektra)	
7 Nov 2004	Simon Goldhill	Simon Goldhill	Love, Sex and Tragedy (exc.)	
7 Nov 2004	Simon Goldhill	Anton Webern	Five Movements, Op. 5 (1st movement – Heftig Bewegt)	
14 Nov 2004	George Duke	Debussy	"Par les Rues et par les Chemins" – from Iberia (Images for Orchestra)	
14 Nov 2004	George Duke	George Duke	"Brazilian Love Affair" from The Essential George Duke	
14 Nov 2004	George Duke	Haydn	1st movement from Piano Sonata No. 50	
14 Nov 2004	George Duke	Miles Davis	"Blue in Green" from Kind of Blue	
14 Nov 2004	George Duke	Milton Nascimento and Lo Borges	"Tudo Que Voce Podia Ser" from Clube Da Esquina	
14 Nov 2004	George Duke	Paul Hindemith	1st movement from Sonata for Trombone and Piano	
14 Nov 2004	George Duke	Sarah Vaughan	"So Many Stars" from Brazilian Romance	
14 Nov 2004	George Duke	Sly and The Family Stone	"If You Want Me To Stay" from Fresh	
14 Nov 2004	George Duke	Stravinsky	"The Chosen One" from The Rite of Spring	
28 Nov 2004	Charles Mackworth-Young	Bach	Prelude and Fugue in E♭ major (from book 2 of the 48)	
28 Nov 2004	Charles Mackworth-Young	Alban Berg	String Quartet, Op. 3 (1st movement, Langsam)	
28 Nov 2004	Charles Mackworth-Young	William Byrd	Nunc Dimittis (from The Great Service)	
28 Nov 2004	Charles Mackworth-Young	Handel	Slow March (from Scipio)	
28 Nov 2004	Charles Mackworth-Young	W. A. Mozart	Symphony No. 39 in E♭, K. 543 (third movement: Minuet and Trio)	
28 Nov 2004	Charles Mackworth-Young	Praetorius	Suite De Ballets (from Terpsichore)	
28 Nov 2004	Charles Mackworth-Young	Schubert	"An die Musik", D547	
28 Nov 2004	Charles Mackworth-Young	Stravinsky	The Rite of Spring (Part 2, Mystic Circles of The Young Girls (Last Section); Glorification of the Chosen One)	
28 Nov 2004	Charles Mackworth-Young	Edgard Varèse	Hyperprism	
28 Nov 2004	Charles Mackworth-Young	Wagner	Siegfried (prelude and opening of act 3, scene 1)	
5 Dec 2004	James Hamilton-Paterson	Bach	Trio Sonata in E♭, BWV 525 (3rd movement – Allegro)	
5 Dec 2004	James Hamilton-Paterson	C. P. E. Bach	Concerto in G minor, W. 32 (1st movement – Allegretto)	
5 Dec 2004	James Hamilton-Paterson	E. T. A. Hoffmann	"Sacrificium Deo" (from Miserere in B♭ minor)	
5 Dec 2004	James Hamilton-Paterson	Elgar	Mina	
5 Dec 2004	James Hamilton-Paterson	Gottfried von Einem	Piano Concerto, Op. 20 (2nd movement – Adagio)	
5 Dec 2004	James Hamilton-Paterson	Haydn	Quartet in F minor, Op. 20/5 (4th movement – Fuga a due soggetti)	
5 Dec 2004	James Hamilton-Paterson	Ned Rorem	The Boy with the Baseball Glove	
5 Dec 2004	James Hamilton-Paterson	Richard Strauss	Suite in B♭ for 13 Wind Instruments, Op. 4 (4th movement – Introduction and Fugue)	
12 Dec 2004	Robert McCrum	Britten	Elegy ("O Rose, Thou Art Sick" (William Blake)) (from Serenade for Tenor, Horn & Strings)	
12 Dec 2004	Robert McCrum	Cole Porter	"Anything Goes" (from Anything Goes)	
12 Dec 2004	Robert McCrum	Colin Matthews	Fourth Sonata (Part 1)	
12 Dec 2004	Robert McCrum	Frank Loesser	"Adelaide's Lament" (from Guys and Dolls)	
12 Dec 2004	Robert McCrum	George Gershwin	"Somebody Loves Me" (from George White's Scandals of 1924)	
12 Dec 2004	Robert McCrum	Gilbert and Sullivan	"When All Night Long" (The Nightmare Song) (from Iolanthe, act 2)	
12 Dec 2004	Robert McCrum	Gillian Welch	"Honey Now" (from the album Hell Among the Yearlings)	
12 Dec 2004	Robert McCrum	Jerome Kern	"Bill" from Showboat (lyrics by P. G. Wodehouse)	
12 Dec 2004	Robert McCrum	Milhaud	"Le Boeuf Sur Le Toit", Op. 58	
12 Dec 2004	Robert McCrum	Rossini	Kyrie (from Petite messe solennelle)	
26 Dec 2004	Stephen Fry	Charles-Valentin Alkan	La Chanson de La Folle Au Bord de La Mer, Op. 31/8	
26 Dec 2004	Stephen Fry	Beethoven	Egmont Overture, Op. 84	
26 Dec 2004	Stephen Fry	Britten	"So Abram rose, and clave the wood" (from War Requiem, Op. 66)	
26 Dec 2004	Stephen Fry	Horst Jankowski	"A Walk in the Black Forest"	
26 Dec 2004	Stephen Fry	W. A. Mozart	"Pa-Pa-Ge-Na" (from Die Zauberflöte, act 2)	
26 Dec 2004	Stephen Fry	Billy Taylor and Richard Lamb	"I Wish I Knew How It Would Feel To Be Free"	
26 Dec 2004	Stephen Fry	Vivian Stanshall	The Intro and the Outro	
26 Dec 2004	Stephen Fry	Wagner	Isoldes Liebestod (from Tristan und Isolde, act 3, scene 3)	
