= With rue my heart is laden =

Lyric poem by A. E. Housman

"With rue my heart is laden" is an eight-line elegiac lyric poem by the English Latin scholar and poet A. E. Housman. It was first published as the 54th poem in his collection A Shropshire Lad, where it appeared under the Roman numeral LIV but without other title. It is usually referred to by its first line. Popular with readers, though not always with critics, it has been set to music by more than 30 composers, including Samuel Barber, George Butterworth and Ralph Vaughan Williams.

== Text ==
With rue my heart is laden
For golden friends I had,
For many a rose-lipt maiden
And many a lightfoot lad.

By brooks too broad for leaping
The lightfoot boys are laid;
The rose-lipt girls are sleeping
In fields where roses fade.

== Metre ==
The poem is written in trimeter quatrains, rhyming ABAB, and alternating 6-syllable and 7-syllable lines.

== Sources ==
In the standard critical edition of Housman's poems Archie Burnett compares the "rose-lipt" maiden and girls in these lines with the "young and rose-lipped cherubin" of Othello IV ii, and the "golden friends" and "lads" in lines 2–4 with the dirge "Fear no more the heat o' the sun" in Cymbeline IV ii: "Golden lads and lasses must, As chimney-sweepers, come to dust". This song, along with "O mistress mine", Housman declared to be "the very summits of lyrical achievement". The word golden was also used widely by Ancient Greek and Latin poets in just such a sense and in similar contexts. The overall tone of the poem is by some critics considered reminiscent of lyrics in the Greek Anthology, perhaps especially those of Meleager, and indeed it was itself translated into Greek elegiacs by the classical scholar L. W. Hunter. Echoes have also been detected of the poems of Heinrich Heine.

== Reception ==
"With rue my heart is laden" has been very frequently anthologised, and its opening line, along with several other phrases from poems by Housman, "are now firmly established commonplaces of everyday use wherever English is written". Critics have often been often less friendly to it than readers, though there are, certainly, favourable notices from the earlier years of the 20th century, when, as George Orwell later remembered, "I and my contemporaries used to recite [poems from A Shropshire Lad] to ourselves, over and over, in a kind of ecstasy". A newspaper book-reviewer in 1903 called "With rue my heart is laden" an "almost perfect little lyric". Holbrook Jackson wrote in 1919 that "the quintessence of regret is revealed with a master's touch". H. W. Garrod in 1929 singled out "With rue my heart is laden" from the other Shropshire Lad poems: "Those golden friends will outlast, I think, the gaol-birds, and suicides, and chaps that were hung; for they have met that immortality which there is in a commonplace when it is handled by a master of the classical manner." In 1939 Carl and Mark Van Doren cited it as an example of those poems in which "his stanzas are so perfectly finished, that a reader is likely at first to miss the meaning and the passion behind them", while the following year the American critic Stuart Gerry Brown believed that in such poems Housman "r[o]se up into another realm" from the good minor poetry which, in his view, comprised most of the rest of Housman's work.

Also in 1940, however, Orwell contrasting his youthful and mature judgements, thought the poem "tinkles [as] it did not seem to tinkle in 1920". Cyril Connolly had already, in 1936, complained of language that was "arch and insipid", Pre-Raphaelite rather than classical, and Housman's biographer Richard Perceval Graves dismissed it in 1979 as "thoroughly inferior...heavily sentimental". One problem was what Connolly called the obscurity of the antithesis in the last two lines, felt also by John Crowe Ransom in 1940. Ransom, in a close analysis, found "the ironical detail of this poem...fairly inept", though his criticism was controverted by Winifred Lynskey in 1944. By 1995 Terence Allan Hoagwood, in a critical study of A Shropshire Lad, could describe "With rue my heart is laden" as "perhaps the most memorable – and the most beautifully made – [poem] in the entire volume."

== Musical settings ==
No book of verse since the time of Shakespeare has been turned to by English songwriters so often as A Shropshire Lad, and of its poems only "Loveliest of trees, the cherry now" and "When I was one-and-twenty" have more settings listed by the LiederNet Archive. The 34 settings known to that website, as of June 2026, include songs and choral works by Percy Lee Atherton, Samuel Barber (in his early Three Songs), Ronald Beckett, Gena Branscombe, George Butterworth (in his Bredon Hill and Other Songs), Edward T. Cone, Vernon Duke, John Gardner, Ivor Gurney (in his The Western Playland), George Heussenstamm, C. W. Orr (in his Five Songs from A Shropshire Lad), Nick Peros, Humphrey Procter-Gregg, Ruth Schönthal, David Van Vactor, Ralph Vaughan Williams (in his Along the Field), George Walker, and Robert Ward. In addition, Bernard Herrmann included it in his A Shropshire Lad, described by him as "a Melodram for orchestra and narrator", and George Butterworth quoted his own setting of "With rue my heart is laden" at the end of his orchestral rhapsody A Shropshire Lad.
