= The Land of Lost Content =

The Land of Lost Content may refer to:

- The Land of Lost Content (book), a biography of schoolteacher Anthony Chenevix-Trench
- The Land of Lost Content (John Ireland), a song cycle
- Land of Lost Content (museum), a museum of popular culture in Shropshire, England

== See also ==
- A Shropshire Lad by A. E. Housman, poem XL, the origin of the phrase
