= Bonnie Annie =

Traditional song

"Bonnie Annie" (Child 24, Roud 172) is a folk ballad recorded from the Scottish and English traditions. Scottish texts are often called Bonnie Annie or The Green Banks of Yarrow, English texts are most often called The Banks of Green Willow. Other titles include The Undutiful Daughter, The High Banks O Yarrow, The Watery Grave, Green Willow, There Was a Rich Merchant that Lived in Strathdinah and The Merchant's Daughter.

The ballad has been collected from traditional singers in Britain, Ireland, and the USA.

== Synopsis ==
A young woman, either a lord's or a merchant's daughter, in some versions called Annie but often nameless, is seduced by a man who is sometimes a sea captain or a squire, or his occupation isn't mentioned. She falls pregnant. He suggests she steals "some of your father's goodwill and some of your mother's money". In other versions she steals gold from her father. They go aboard a ship. On the voyage she needs "women's help", presumably to help deliver her child, but this is not available. In some variants the ship will not sail, and either the lot falls on Annie or she asks to be thrown overboard "both me and my baby", in others her lover volunteers to throw her and the baby overboard for no apparent reason. He watches her swim, in some versions until she reaches the banks of green willow. He orders her to be buried, either in a coffin made of gold, or in a coffin with golden nails.

"Oh make my love a coffin,
Of the gold that shines yellow,
And she shall be buried
By the banks of green willow."
(Collected from Mrs Overd, Langport, Somerset by Cecil Sharp in 1904.)

== Motifs ==
The motif of the lots and throwing a person from the ship may be derived from the tale of Jonah. Another ballad featuring these motifs is "Brown Robyn's Confession", (Child 57, Roud 3882).

== Early versions ==
=== Broadsides and early printed versions ===
Child published two versions, both from Scottish sources. The song doesn't seem to have been printed by broadside publishers.

=== Versions collected from traditional singers ===
The Banks of Green Willow variant was popular with traditional singers across the south of England, where 33 versions were collected in the early twentieth century (14 in Somerset, 8 in Devon). One version was collected in Gloucestershire and another from the Shropshire singer Fred Jordan. 11 versions under various titles were collected in Scotland, one in Ireland and two in the US, both in Maine. Cecil Sharp reported the song as "very generally sung throughout Somerset".

== Recordings ==
=== Field recordings ===
There are two 1909 wax cylinder recordings of a workhouse worker named David Clements in Basingstoke, Hampshire, England in the British Library Sound Archive, one recorded by George Butterworth, the other by Ralph Vaughan Williams, both of which are publicly available. Since one seems to pick up where the other leaves off it seems possible that they were recorded on the same day in 1909.

A farm servant called George Hay (1878–1954) from the village of Portsoy in Aberdeenshire, Scotland was recorded singing a version of the song in 1952, which can be heard on the Tobar an Dualchais website.

Peter Kennedy later recorded a Mrs. Maguire of Belfast singing "The Green Banks of Yarrow" variant.

=== Recordings by revival singers and groups ===
This song has frequently been recorded by folk singers including A.L. Lloyd, Ewan McColl and Peggy Seeger, Nic Jones, Martin Carthy, Tony Rose, Dick Gaughan, Alison McMorland and Peta Webb as The Green Banks of Yarrow, Steve Turner as Bonnie Annie, Patti Reid as Bonnie Annie.

== Cultural Influences ==
The tune of a version of The Banks of Green Willows collected by George Butterworth and Ralph Vaughan Williams was used by Butterworth in his orchestral piece "The Banks of Green Willow" composed in 1913.

== Discussion ==
George Ritchie Kinloch, Child's source for one of his versions, states in his notes to "Bonnie Annie" that

"There is a prevalent belief among sea-faring people, that, if a person who has committed any heinous crime be on ship-board, the vessel, as if conscious of its guilty burden, becomes unmanageable, and will not sail till the offender is removed: to discover whom, they usually resort to the trial of those on board, by casting lots; and the individual upon whom the lot falls is declared the criminal, it being believed that Divine Providence interposes in this manner to point out the guilty person."

== Adaptations ==
Reverend Sabine Baring-Gould adapted the tale as The Undutiful Daughter in Old English Fairy Tales: a vain and haughty princess consults with a "gypsy" or witch character, who prophesizes she will marry a king, be carried in carriage driven by thousand white-maned horses, be attended by servants in blue, sleep in a golden bed beneath "a curtain of living green". It turns out that her destiny was an unfortunate one: the golden bed was her coffin, and the curtain of living green was a weeping willow.

== See also ==
- List of Child Ballads
- Sailors' superstitions
