= Into my heart an air that kills =

1886 poem by A. E. Housman

"Into my heart an air that kills" is a poem by A. E. Housman, written in 1886 and first published in his 1896 collection A Shropshire Lad, where it bears no title apart from the Roman numeral XL. Though somewhat neglected by critics, in common with most of Housman's poems, it has been a favourite with the British poetry-reading public and frequently set by composers.

== Text ==
Into my heart an air that kills
From yon far country blows:
What are those blue remembered hills,
What spires, what farms are those?

That is the land of lost content,
I see it shining plain,
The happy highways where I went
And cannot come again.

== Metre ==
The poem is written in a traditional ballad meter of alternating iambic tetrameters and iambic trimeters. The second and fourth lines of each verse rhyme, and, unlike most ballads, so do the first and third.

== Themes ==
The theme of this poem is a familiar one in Housman's Shropshire Lad poetry: the contemplation of the speaker's happy and innocent life as a country youth and the contrasting maturity of his present urban condition. The poet's view of this contrast is neither romantic nor sentimental, the memories it evokes being painful and even destructive – "an air that kills" – rather than salutary. The tone is melancholic, bitter and despairing.

== Analogues ==
Verbal similarities, sometimes close, have been pointed out between "Into my heart an air that kills" and the ballad "The Ship o' the Fiend", lines 81–84; Gray's "Ode on a Distant Prospect of Eton College", lines 1, 11–16; Keats's "Ode on a Grecian Urn", lines 8–10; G. A. Simcox's Amabel, line 998; Christina Rossetti's "Dost Thou Not Care?", lines 9–10; and Hamlet, IV, v, 188–192. There are thematic parallels with Dylan Thomas's "Fern Hill", Yeats's "Lake Isle of Inisfree", and Edward Thomas's "Adlestrop". "Into my heart" can also be connected with other poems from A Shropshire Lad: the same imagery of the wind of life can be found in "From far, from eve and morning" and "The winds out of the west land blow", the country scene viewed by a distant stranger in "The Merry Guide", and the bitterness of lost youth in "On the idle hill of summer".

== Reception ==
Harold Bloom cited "Into my heart" as an example of those poems by Housman unfairly neglected by critics in favour of Auden, Pound and others. For his own part, he was, he said, "puzzled how any lover of poetry could fail to respond to [it]". In 1940 George Orwell similarly bucked the critical trend with his assertion that "although one gets into trouble nowadays for saying so, there is a number of his poems ... that are not likely to remain long out of favour"; he instanced "Into my heart" as one of these survivors. Confirming his prediction, the British public, asked to name its favourite 20th-century poems in a BBC poll, voted "Into my heart an air that kills" into the top 100, in spite of its 19th-century date.

Ted Hughes wrote that Housman's works "have entered the national consciousness". "Into my heart" has done so to the extent that the entire poem was included in The Oxford Dictionary of Quotations, Bartlett's Familiar Quotations and The New Yale Book of Quotations. The phrase an air that kills was used in book-titles by Francis King, Margaret Millar, and Andrew Schneider; blue remembered hills by Rosemary Sutcliff, Dennis Potter, Denise Robertson, Patrick Gordon-Duff-Pennington, Showell Styles, and James Roose-Evans; the land of lost content by Noel Barber, Michael Raven, and Robert Whittaker; and happy highways by Storm Jameson, Rupert Croft-Cooke, Henry Lytton-Cobbold, and G. V. Portus.

== Musical settings ==
Many composers have been drawn to set poems by Housman, not least "Into my heart an air that kills". There have been songs for voice and piano by, among others, Thomas Armstrong, Marc Blitzstein, Edward T. Cone, Vernon Duke, Robin Field, Margaret Ruthven Lang, C. W. Orr, Nick Peros, Humphrey Procter-Gregg, and Sir Arthur Somervell. Howard Skempton set it for soprano and piano quintet, Ivor Gurney included it in his The Western Playland, a cycle for baritone and piano quintet, and John Gardner in his choral work Three Poems from "A Shropshire Lad".
