= A Shropshire Lad (rhapsody) =

1911 composition by George Butterworth

George Butterworth, c. 1914

George Butterworth's A Shropshire Lad: Rhapsody for Orchestra, first performed in 1913, is a work in the English pastoral style based on two of Butterworth's own settings of poems by A. E. Housman. It is a frequently performed work, for many Butterworth's greatest, and has come to be seen as an elegy before the fact for the young men who, like the composer himself, died in the First World War.

== History ==
Between about 1909 and 1911, Butterworth wrote two song cycles on texts by A. E. Housman, Six Songs from A Shropshire Lad and Bredon Hill and Other Songs. His rhapsody A Shropshire Lad, begun in 1909 or 1910 and completed in 1911, was, according to Butterworth himself, intended as an epilogue to these 11 songs which would "express the home-thoughts of the exiled Shropshire Lad". He first intended to call it The Land of Lost Content, then The Cherry Tree, before deciding on the final title.

It was first performed on 2 October 1913 at the Leeds Festival, conducted by Arthur Nikisch. The composer himself was present, as was his friend Ralph Vaughan Williams. Edward Elgar may also have attended. The first London performance was conducted by Geoffrey Toye at the Queen's Hall on 20 March 1914.

In 1916, after Butterworth's death in action at the Battle of the Somme, A Shropshire Lad was performed at the Royal College of Music in his memory. It was performed at the Henry Wood Promenade Concerts in 1917, and again in 1929. It was recorded by Adrian Boult in 1921 and released on the HMV label. It was played with great success in Zürich in 1921, and there were other overseas performances in the interwar period in Toronto in 1928, Mühlacker in 1931, Salzburg in 1935, and Montreal in 1936. The work was broadcast by the BBC on Armistice Day, 1924, and in 1944 it was played at an Empire Day Concert at the Albert Hall in the presence of members of the royal family. In 1992 it was used on the soundtrack of the film The Long Day Closes.

== Music ==
A Shropshire Lad is scored for 2 flutes, 2 oboes, cor anglais, 2 clarinets, bass clarinet, 2 bassoons, 4 French horns, 2 trumpets, 3 trombones, timpani, harp, and strings.

The work opens in A minor with a theme marked Moderato, molto tranquillo e senza rigore, which alternates between violas and clarinets over muted strings before being taken up by a solo clarinet. It then moves into a passage for full orchestra in E flat major, varied at one point by a tranquillo section in B minor. It finally returns to the A minor theme, introducing also a new subject played by solo flute.

== Sources ==
Butterworth makes extensive use of his own setting, in Six Songs from A Shropshire Lad, of Housman's poem "Loveliest of trees, the cherry now". In the flute solo towards the end of the rhapsody he quotes from the last song of his Bredon Hill, "With rue my heart is laden". Influences from the music of Elgar, Sibelius, Vaughan Williams, Debussy and Wagner have been detected. Though the rhapsody has a decided flavour of English folk song, no folk melodies were actually used.

== Reception ==
From its first performance Butterworth's rhapsody was well-received in the press. It was called "remarkable" and "full of wonderful beauty and poetry", though the Daily Telegraph spoke for some in feeling that it was a work "more of a promise than an actual achievement". After the First World War, A Shropshire Lad achieved great popularity as an expression of the national sense of loss at the death of so many young men, not least of Butterworth himself, and indeed, even in the 21st century Michael Kennedy could write that "It is...almost impossible to hear this potently nostalgic work without thinking of 'the lads that will die in their hundreds and never be old'". The words "poignant" and "tender" were used repeatedly by critics in the immediate post-war period. The Athenaeum's reviewer in 1920 called it "as beautiful and noble a thing as any modern English orchestral work". Boult said that its perfection eliminated every superfluous note.

In recent years, critics have called it "exquisite", a work which "represents the English folk-song school at its most captivatingly atmospheric". Richard Drakeford wrote that it is "a small masterpiece, poetically orchestrated, beautifully shaped, and rising to an impassioned climax", Jeremy Dibble considered the A minor frame of the work "one of the most haunting in all British music". It is, for many, Butterworth's greatest work.
