= Loveliest of trees, the cherry now =

Lyric poem by A. E. Housman

"Loveliest of trees, the cherry now" is a lyric poem by the English Latin scholar and poet A. E. Housman. Originally written in 1895, it was first published as the second poem in his collection A Shropshire Lad, where it appeared under the Roman numeral II, but without other title. It is usually referred to by its first line. Its theme, voiced by a young man contemplating cherry blossom, is the transitoriness of life and beauty, and the need to enjoy them while they last. It is probably Housman's best-known poem, and one of the most anthologized of English lyrics. Its opening line has become a part of the language, "inextricably lodged in the public mind and vocabulary". In a 1995 poll it was chosen as one of the British people's 100 favourite poems. It has been set to music over 60 times.

== Text ==
Loveliest of trees, the cherry now
Is hung with bloom along the bough,
And stands about the woodland ride
Wearing white for Eastertide.

Now, of my threescore years and ten,
Twenty will not come again,
And take from seventy springs a score,
It only leaves me fifty more.

And since to look at things in bloom
Fifty springs are little room,
About the woodlands I will go
To see the cherry hung with snow.

== Composition ==
The original draft of the poem, the manuscript of which still survives, has been dated to April or May 1895. This first version consists of only two stanzas reading as follows:

Loveliest of trees, the cherry now
Is hung with bloom along the bough,
And stands about the woodlands wide
Wearing snow for Eastertide.

And since to look at things you love
Fifty times is not enough
About the woodlands I will go
To see the cherry hung with snow.

The middle stanza was composed later, and reached its present state only after much rewriting. "Loveliest of trees" was first published, without title, as the second poem in his collection A Shropshire Lad (1896).

== Metre ==
The poem consists of three four-line stanzas in rhyming couplets. With one exception the lines are iambic tetrameters, but this metre is disrupted by the first word, Loveliest.

== Themes ==
In common with several other of the Shropshire Lad poems, including "Bredon Hill" and "Is my team ploughing", "Loveliest of trees" is a poem dealing with the English seasons. It also presents a young, naïve and innocent man's realization of his own mortality seen through the analogy of the short-lived blossom of the typical – rather than of any individual – cherry tree. This melancholy theme is relieved by the message that beauty is to be enjoyed while it can be; that it is indeed their very evanescence that make the cherry blossoms and life as a whole so valuable, and that ageing and death are just as important as youth and beauty in making the complete life in all its richness.

Housman chose as his symbol of transient beauty a subject close to his heart. The gardens of Housman's childhood home boasted a locally famous cherry tree; for several years in the 1890s he recorded in his diary the flowering of cherry trees; and in his latter years he was responsible for the planting of an avenue of cherry trees at his college.

== Analogues and sources ==
The "threescore years and ten" of the poem allude to Psalms 90:10, "The days of our years are threescore years and ten". Other verbal and thematic sources of the poem have been suggested in lines from Shakespeare's The Tempest, Marlowe's The Jew of Malta, Andrew Lang's "The Last Maying", Robert Louis Stevenson's Underwoods, and Robert Bridges' "Spring Goeth All in White".

== Reception ==
"Loveliest of trees" was from the first judged by critics to be one of A Shropshire Lad's best poems. Hubert Bland, reviewing that volume in The New Age, wrote of the "per[fect] simplicity [that] Mr Housman has given it with the swift, unfaltering touch of a master's hand". John Bell Henneman, in another review of the same book, singled it out for high praise. The enthusiasm continued in the inter-war years. Iolo Aneurin Williams thought that "The loveliness of the English spring has perhaps never been put more feelingly, more exquisitely". Charles Williams considered it as exquisite a nature-poem as any in English. Nevile Watts instanced it as one of the Housman poems which, save for their lack of "magic", show him to have been worthy of "a seat beside the two greatest of our lyrists – Shakespeare and Blake". Louis Untermeyer believed it to be arguably the finest lyric in the language. One dissenting voice came from Edith Sitwell, who thought it exemplified Housman's lack of any "gift for illuminating or transmuting things seen. What [does the last stanza of "Loveliest of trees"] add to our experience? Nothing." Many more recent critics have been similarly dismissive, Benjamin T. Fisher noting in 2000 that from "some recent critiques of 'Loveliest of trees'...we might come away thinking how, in reality, this is one of the veriest bits of versified trash, in theme and technique, that has ever masqueraded as poetry". Peter Edgerly Firchow, for example, considered it a failure, the second stanza being too convoluted and verbose to perform its pivotal role in the poem, and nature being presented in too abstract a form. Terence Allan Hoagwood, on the other hand, praised the "complexity of feeling that is remarkable given the simple (and few) words that Housman has used", and D. T. Siebert called it "a little masterpiece of carpe diem". Its popularity with readers is much more clear-cut. In 1995, in a poll conducted by the BBC, it was selected as one of the British nation's 100 favourite poems.

== Musical settings ==
No book of verse since the time of Shakespeare has been turned to by English songwriters so often as A Shropshire Lad, and of the poems contained therein "Loveliest of trees" is one of the most frequently set, over 60 such songs and choral works being known. These include settings by

- George Butterworth, in Six Songs from A Shropshire Lad
- Henryk Górecki
- Ivor Gurney, in The Western Playland and again in Five Songs
- David Matthews, in Three Housman Songs
- E. J. Moeran
- C. W. Orr
- Graham Peel, in Songs of a Shropshire Lad
- Sir Arthur Somervell, in A Shropshire Lad.

In addition, Butterworth used his setting of the poem as the basis of his orchestral rhapsody A Shropshire Lad.
