= Graham McInnes =

Graham McInnes may refer to:

- Graham McInnes (author) (1912-1970), son of James Campbell McInnes
- Graham McInnes (director), see List of Allied propaganda films of World War II
- Graham McInnes (footballer) (born 1938), Scottish footballer, see List of Bury F.C. players (1–24 appearances)
