= Hugh Butterworth =

English cricketer and school teacher

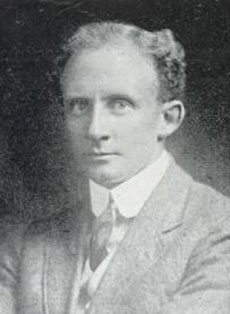

Personal information
- Full name: Hugh Montagu Butterworth
- Born: 1 November 1885; Saffron Walden, Essex, England
- Died: 25 September 1915 (aged 29); Hooge, Belgium
- Relatives: Joseph Butterworth (great great grandfather); Alexander Kaye Butterworth (uncle); George Butterworth (cousin)

Domestic team information
- Years: Team
- 1906: Oxford University

Career statistics
Competition	First-class
Matches	3
Runs scored	78
Batting average	13.00
100s/50s	0/0
Top score	31
Catches/stumpings	2/–
- Source: Cricket Archive, 24 November 2014

Hugh Montagu Butterworth (1 November 1885 – 25 September 1915) was an English first-class cricketer and a school teacher in New Zealand who was killed in action in World War I.

== Life in England ==
Hugh Butterworth was the first child of George Montagu Butterworth (12 May 1858 – 12 December 1941) and his wife Catherine (née Warde). After Hugh, five daughters followed. George was a solicitor and a tennis player who reached the semi-finals at Wimbledon in 1880.

Hugh was educated at Marlborough and at University College, Oxford. In mid-May 1906 he played two first-class matches for the university team in 1906 as an opening batsman, then, two days later, one match for Marylebone Cricket Club (MCC) against the Oxford team, when he made his highest score, 31. He also represented Oxford at Rugby union, hockey and rackets. He played several matches for Wiltshire from 1904 to 1906, mostly in the Minor Counties competition, scoring 122 against Dorset in 1905 and 106 in a victory over MCC in 1906.

A few weeks before Butterworth's final exams in 1907 his family ran into financial difficulties and his father decided to move to New Zealand, where he settled in Cashmere Hills, Christchurch. Hugh and the rest of the family soon joined him, so Hugh was never able to complete his studies.

== Life in New Zealand ==
Butterworth took up a position as a master at Wanganui Collegiate School in September 1907 and remained there until he left to enlist in the British Army in December 1914. He taught English language and literature, and Latin. Known to the students as "Curly", he was a much-admired master. One of his students, Arthur Porritt (who later became Baron Porritt, New Zealand's Governor-General) said, "he was almost automatically loved by every boy who knew him". Another, Roy Joblin, said, "Butterworth's understanding of the boy must have amounted to genius" and praised "his sportsmanship, his almost permanent good temper, his brilliant wit, his ever accessible sympathy and his love of all that was straight and clean".

Butterworth was phenomenally successful in Saturday afternoon club cricket in Wanganui, scoring four double-centuries and a triple-century. In the early part of the 1914-15 season he scored 296 and 311 in consecutive innings. He played several non-first-class matches for the Wanganui representative team between 1910 and 1914 and was part of the team that won and held the Hawke Cup in 1913-14 and 1914-15. His highest score for Wanganui was 50 (top score in a team total of 203) against South Taranaki in January 1914.

== War service and death ==
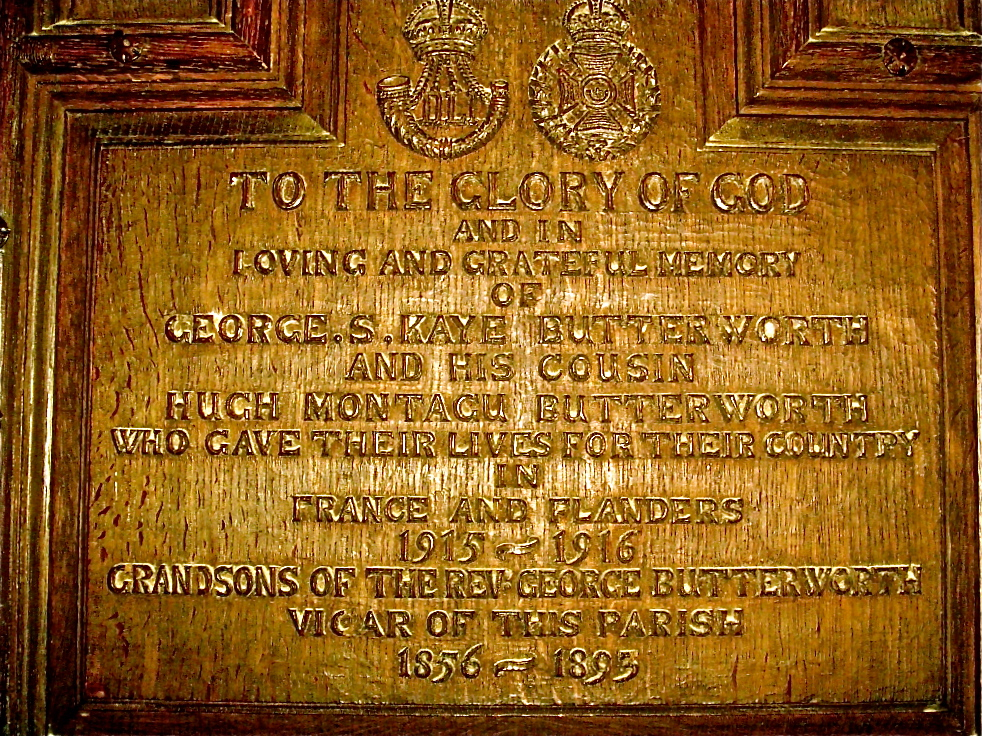
Plaque, Deerhurst Church

Butterworth returned to England early in 1915 and joined the Rifle Brigade (Prince Consort's Own) as a lieutenant. He was later promoted to the rank of captain. He served in Flanders from May 1915 until he was killed in action in September 1915. Wanganui Collegiate said in tribute that "his life of unselfish devotion to duty will serve as a pattern for many years to those who had the good fortune to know him".

His cousin George Butterworth, the composer, also died in action in World War I. George's father had a plaque in their memory placed in Deerhurst church, Gloucestershire.

A book of his letters from the front, Letters from Flanders, was published in New Zealand in 1916. It was re-published as Blood and Iron in 2011 by Pen & Sword, with a biographical introduction by the military historian Jon Cooksey.
