= Frederick B. Kiddle =

English pianist, organist and accompanist (1874–1951)

Frederick B. Kiddle (1874 – 6 December 1951) was a prominent English pianist, organist and accompanist.

Kiddle was born at Frome, Somerset, and studied at the Royal College of Music under Sir Walter Parratt, Rockstro and Higgs. In 1902 he became principal accompanist for the Promenade Concerts at Queen's Hall, in succession to Percy Pitt, and he remained there as permanent organist and accompanist for the next 25 years, retiring at about the time when the BBC took over the proms.

== Organist and accompanist at Queen's Hall ==
As examples of his work as organist, Kiddle introduced Alexandre Guilmant's Symphony in D minor for organ and orchestra (a work with a very long pedal passage) in 1902, and gave the first performance of Max Bruch's suite for organ and orchestra at a Symphony Concert in May 1909. In November 1909, under Henry J. Wood, he played Marco Enrico Bossi's new organ concerto. In 1912 he played the Benjamin Dale Concert Piece for organ and orchestra at Queen's Hall, and at a prom late in 1913 he played the Fantaisie Triomphale (for organ and orchestra) of Théodore Dubois. Between 1909 and 1925 Kiddle performed Tobias Matthay's Concert Piece No 1 in A minor five times at the Proms.

He was the soloist in Saint-Saëns's Symphony for orchestra, organ and piano in November 1916. In a prom in 1927 he played Marcel Dupré's Cortège et Litanei. As a piano soloist, he joined Henry Wood and York Bowen in the first British performance of Mozart's F minor Concerto for Three Pianos (K242) on 12 September 1907, under the baton of Henri Verbrugghen. When Henry Wood took control of the Norwich Festival in 1908 he took Kiddle with him as organist for the entire event.

== Accompanist to Gervase Elwes ==
As the permanent accompanist for the Queen's Hall proms, naturally Kiddle accompanied almost everybody, but his great work in this role (demanding the highest standards of musicianship) is particularly remembered through his permanent connection with the tenor Gervase Elwes. In the early 1900s, when he was also organist of the parish church of St Marylebone in London, he was invited by Elwes (then just beginning his professional career) to act as his accompanist. Elwes regarded him as a most conscientious musician, and the two worked together throughout Elwes's career, until his death in 1921, often working several hours a day. Elwes instructed Kiddle in the meaning of the words of songs in French and German, so that there should be a unity of purpose in their performance, and he invariably brought Kiddle forward to share the applause at his concerts.

Kiddle's association with Elwes naturally brought him closely into the world of Roger Quilter's music, which he played with great verve and rhythmical insight. Quilter dedicated one of his Nora Hopper songs, 'Blossom-time', to Kiddle in 1914. Kiddle's playing as accompanist is heard on most of the recordings of Gervase Elwes, including the Vaughan Williams song cycle On Wenlock Edge with the London String Quartet in 1917. He can also be heard in recordings with Lionel Tertis, Albert Sammons or the tenor Hubert Eisdell, another Quilter dedicatee.

== Kiddle and Liddle ==
An exact contemporary of Frederick B. Kiddle was the fine accompanist Samuel H. Liddle, closely associated with Elwes's friend and supporter Harry Plunket Greene, and composer of various songs popularised by Dame Clara Butt, including her much-recorded version of 'Abide with me'. The rhyme of their names and roles was often commented upon, not least in a short humorous verse by Harry Graham:

'With the cunningest collusion
And a deep desire to diddle,
Mr Kiddle courts confusion
With his colleague, Mr Liddle.'

Gerald Moore added 'These gentlemen were the best of friends and indeed it would be hard to find two artists more courteous and affable. If one were mistaken for the other, however, they were immediately transformed into snarling homicides.'

== Sources ==
- Arthur Eaglefield Hull, A Dictionary of Modern Music and Musicians (Dent, London 1924).
- R. Elkin, Queen's Hall 1893-1941 (Rider, London 1944).
- W. Elwes and R. Elwes, Gervase Elwes - The Story of His Life (Grayson and Grayson, London 1935).
- H. Graham, The World We Laugh In (Methuen, London 1936).
- V. Langfield, Roger Quilter - His Life and Music (Boydell, Woodbridge 2002).
- G. Moore, Am I Too Loud? (Penguin, Harmondsworth 1966).
- H. J. Wood, My Life of Music (Cheap Edition, Gollancz, London 1946).
