= William Hyde (artist) =

English painter

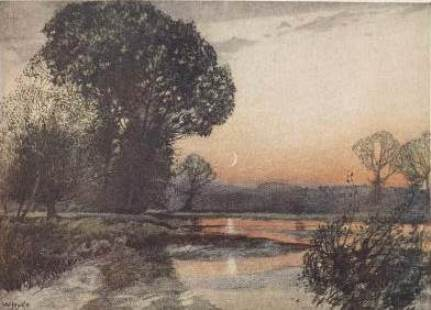
"On the Teme", one of William Hyde's coloured illustrations for A.E. Housman's A Shropshire Lad (1908)

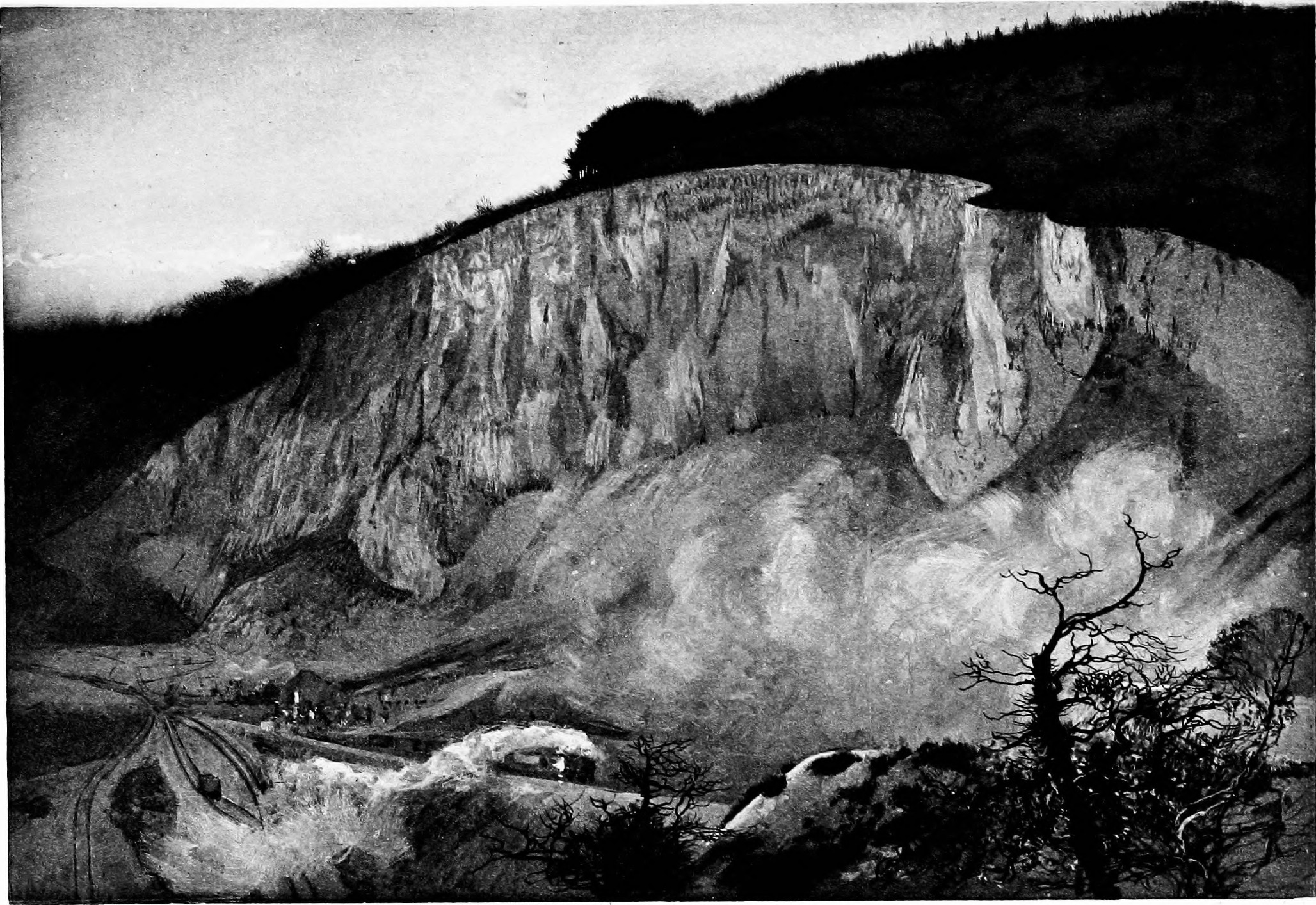
Illustration for Belloc's (1904) The Old Road

William Hyde (1859–1925) was a well known artist, printmaker and illustrator. He typically worked in oils and water colours. He was a student of the Slade School of Fine Art where he mastered the arts of painting, etching, engraving and the then popular mezzotint. He had several works shown at exhibitions at the Royal Academy between 1889 and 1891. He is perhaps most known for his Impressions of London (1898) and for his illustrations of the first illustrated edition of Housman's A Shropshire Lad and Hilaire Belloc's (1904) The Old Road. Some of his paintings are at the Guildford House Gallery and the Imperial War Museum.
