= Alexander Kaye Butterworth =

English tennis & rugby union player

Sir Alexander K Butterworth
- Born: 4 December 1854; Clifton, Bristol, Gloucestershire
- Died: 23 January 1946 (aged 91); Hampstead, Middlesex
- Resting place: St John-at-Hampstead Church, Hampstead
- Employer(s): Great Western Railway; North Eastern Railway; Railway Executive Committee; Victoria Park Hospital for Heart and Chest Diseases
- Spouse(s): Julia Wigan 1884–1911 (her death); Dorothea Mavor 1916–46 (his death)
- Children: George Butterworth (1885–1916)
- Parents: Rev. George Butterworth (father); Frances Maria Butterworth (née Kaye) (mother)
- Relatives: Joseph Butterworth (great grandfather); Hugh Butterworth (nephew)

Sir Alexander Kaye Butterworth (1854–1946) was the General Manager of the North Eastern Railway and also chairman of the Railway Executive during the First World War. He was the father of the composer George Butterworth (1885–1916)

== Personal life ==
Butterworth was born on 4 December 1854 at Clifton, Bristol, Gloucestershire, the son of the Reverend George Butterworth of Deerhurst, Gloucestershire, and his wife Frances Maria Kaye (daughter of Bishop John Kaye). Butterworth was a great-grandson of the abolitionist Joseph Butterworth. He was educated at Marlborough College from August 1868 to March 1874, and then attended London University, where he graduated in 1877.

Butterworth married Julia Marguerite Wigan at St Margaret's, Westminster on 16 July 1884. Their son George became a composer. He was killed in action during the Battle of the Somme in 1916. Julia died in 1911. Butterworth was knighted in 1914. He married Dorothea Mavor in 1916.

== Sports ==
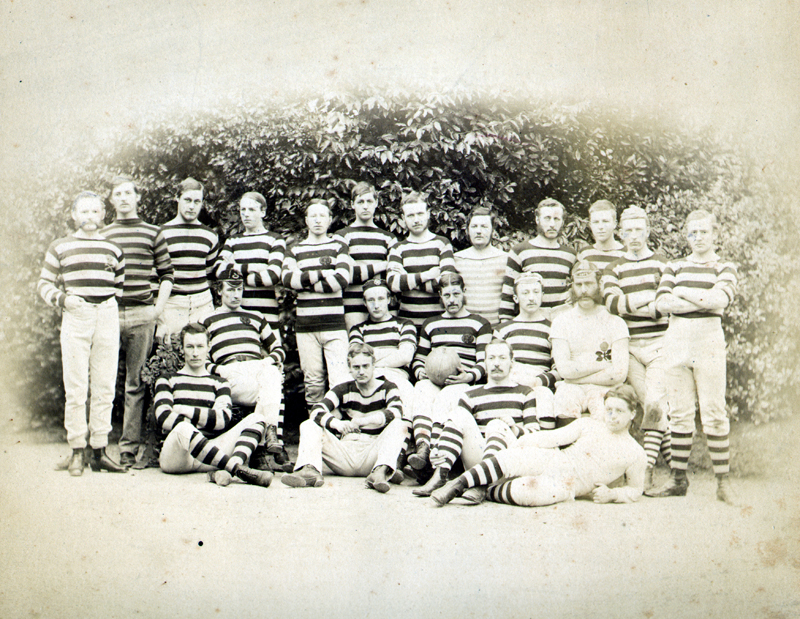
Clifton RFC team 1874–75. Butterworth is at extreme right of picture.

Butterworth played rackets and rugby at school, as well as performing gymnastics. In 1874, he joined Clifton Rugby Football Club. He played tennis at Wimbledon in 1880, losing in the first round to R. T. Richardson 3–0.

== Career ==
Butterworth qualified for The Bar in 1878, and qualified as a solicitor in 1883. He gained his Bachelor of Law degree in 1884, He then joined the Great Western Railway, working in its legal department. During 1889 and 1890, Butterworth played a leading role in the Railway Rates Inquiry, acting for the English, Irish and Scottish railway companies. In 1890, he was appointed a Clerk of the Peace for Bedfordshire, a position he held for six months, before joining the North Eastern Railway (NER) as a solicitor in February 1891. In 1905, he succeeded Sir George Gibb as General Manager. He represented the NER in his capacity a company solicitor at the inquiry into the railway accident at Thirsk in 1892.

During the First World War, in addition to his position with the NER, Butterworth was appointed chairman of the Railway Executive Committee, a position he held until 1919. He was also chairman of the Victoria Park Hospital for Heart and Chest Diseases from 1916 to 1935. He was succeeded in that position by Henry Guest. Butterworth served on the Civil Service Arbitration Board from 1917 to 1920. He retired from his position as General Manager of the NER on 31 December 1921 and was succeeded by Ralph Wedgwood. Butterworth remained in the employ of the NER until it ceased to exist at the Grouping of the Railways in 1923.

== Death ==
Butterworth died on 23 January 1946 at his home in Hampstead, Middlesex following a short illness. His funeral was held on 28 January at St John-at-Hampstead Church and he was interred in the churchyard.
