= The Land of Lost Content (John Ireland) =

Song cycle by John Ireland

The Land of Lost Content is a song cycle for voice and piano composed in 1920–21 by John Ireland (1879–1962). It consists of settings of six poems by A. E. Housman from his 1896 collection A Shropshire Lad.

A typical performance takes about 11 minutes. The songs are, with Roman numerals from A Shropshire Lad, and first lines where Housman did not title his poem:

1. XXIX "The Lent Lily"
2. XV "Ladslove" ("Look not in my eyes")
3. XVII "Goal and Wicket" ("Twice a week the winter thorough")
4. XXXIII "The Vain Desire" ("If truth in hearts that perish")
5. XXII "The Encounter" ("The street sounds to the soldiers' tread")
6. LVII "Epilogue" ("You smile upon your friend today")

The title of the cycle is taken from Housman's poem "Into my heart an air that kills", XL in A Shropshire Lad:

That is the land of lost content,
I see it shining plain,
The happy highways where I went
And cannot come again.

— lines 5-8
