= On Wenlock Edge (song cycle) =

Song cycle by Ralph Vaughan Williams

- by Ralph Vaughan Williams
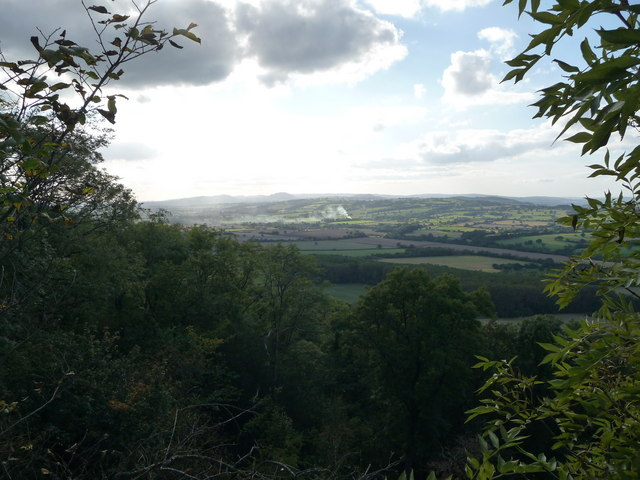
- View from Wenlock Edge, Shropshire
- Genre: Song cycle
- Text: Extracts from A Shropshire Lad by A. E. Housman (1896)
- Language: en
- Movements: 6
- Scoring: tenor; string quartet; piano

Premiere
- Date: 15 November 1909
- Location: Aeolian Hall, London
- Performers: Gervase Elwes, Frederick Kiddle and the Schwiller Quartet

On Wenlock Edge is a song cycle composed in 1909 by Ralph Vaughan Williams for tenor, piano and string quartet. The cycle comprises settings of six poems from A. E. Housman's 1896 collection A Shropshire Lad. A typical performance lasts around 22 minutes. It was premiered by Gervase Elwes, Frederick Kiddle and the Schwiller Quartet on 15 November 1909 in the Aeolian Hall, London.

It was later orchestrated by the composer in a version first performed on 24 January 1924. Subsequent editions show a measure excised from the final movement (Clun): the third measure from the end. The Boosey and Hawkes 1946 score notes indicates this in a footnote on the last page. The cycle was recorded by Elwes, Kiddle and the London String Quartet in 1917.

The Roman numerals in the following list refor to the poems in A Shropshire Lad,: including "Is My Team Ploughing". Bredon Hill and Clun refer to locations.

1. XXXI "On Wenlock Edge"
2. XXXII "From Far, from Eve and Morning"
3. XXVII "Is My Team Ploughing"
4. XVIII "Oh, When I Was in Love with You"
5. XXI "Bredon Hill" (first line: "In summertime on Bredon")
6. L "Clun" (Housman's title, first line: "Clunton and Clunbury")

An earlier version of "Is My Team Ploughing?", for voice and piano, had been performed on 26 January 1909 in a concert sponsored by Elwes and James Friskin.

To Housman's annoyance, Vaughan Williams omitted the third and fourth verses of "Is My Team Ploughing". The composer remarked in 1927 or later that he felt “that the composer has a perfect right artistically to set any portion of a poem he chooses provided he does not actually alter the sense”.
