= Is My Team Ploughing =

1896 poem by A. E. Housman

IS MY TEAM PLOUGHING

"Is my team ploughing,
That I was used to drive
And hear the harness jingle
When I was man alive?"

Ay, the horses trample,
The harness jingles now;
No change though you lie under
The land you used to plough.

'Is football playing
Along the river shore.
With lads to chase the leather,
Now I stand up no more?'

Ay, the ball is flying,
The lads play heart and soul;
The goal stands up, the keeper
Stands up to keep the goal.

"Is my girl happy,
That I thought hard to leave,
And has she tired of weeping
As she lies down at eve?"

Ay, she lies down lightly,
She lies not down to weep:
Your girl is well contented.
Be still, my lad, and sleep.

"Is my friend hearty,
Now I am thin and pine,
And has he found to sleep in
A better bed than mine?"

Yes, lad, I lie easy,
I lie as lads would choose;
I cheer a dead man's sweetheart,
Never ask me whose.

"Is My Team Ploughing" is a poem by A. E. Housman, published as number XXVII in his 1896 collection A Shropshire Lad. It is a conversation between a dead man and his still living friend. Toward the end of the poem it is implied that the friend is now with the girl left behind when the narrator died.

The text, along with other poems from A Shropshire Lad, has been famously set to music by several English composers, including George Butterworth (Six Songs from A Shropshire Lad), Ralph Vaughan Williams (On Wenlock Edge) and Ivor Gurney. Vaughan Williams omitted the third and fourth verses, to Housman's annoyance, writing years later that he felt “a composer has a perfect right artistically to set any portion of a poem he chooses provided he does not actually alter the sense” of it. “I also feel,” he added, “that a poet should be grateful to anyone who fails to perpetuate such lines as: “‘The goal stands up, the Keeper / Stands up to keep the Goal.’”
