= Elinore Blaisdell =

American illustrator

- Born: Eleanor Blaisdell; October 15, 1900; Brooklyn, New York, U.S.
- Died: November 22, 1994 (aged 94); Lancaster, Pennsylvania, U.S.
- Occupations: Illustrator, writer, designer, editor

Elinore Blaisdell (October 15, 1900 – 1994) was an American illustrator known for her work on Bulfinch's Mythology (1947), Charles Lamb and Mary Lamb's Tales from Shakespeare, Louisa May Alcott's Little Women, and A. E. Housman's A Shropshire Lad (1932).

== Early life and education ==
Blaisdell was born in Brooklyn, New York, the daughter of Edward Kendall Blaisdell and Sara Elizabeth Harris Blaisdell. Her father was a lumber dealer; both of her parents died when she was young. She was a student of Robert Brackman at the Art Students League of New York, and studied drawing with Naum Los. She attended Pratt Institute, and the Slade School of Fine Art in London.

== Career ==
Blaisdell began making illustrations for print in her childhood; she had a drawing published on the children's page of the Brooklyn Daily Eagle in 1911. She wrote, illustrated, and edited books, mostly for young readers. From 1950 to 1979 she also designed hundreds of greeting cards, under several pseudonyms. She won the Julia Ellsworth Ford Prize from the Ford Foundation in 1939, for a children's book she wrote and illustrated, Falcon Fly Back, based on her late husband's research. She was a friend of writer Edith Hamilton in New York.

Blaisdell moved to Bradford, Pennsylvania, in 1971, and to Lancaster, Pennsylvania in 1979. In 1980 she showed eight of her paintings, mostly still lifes, at the Tremellen Gallery in Lancaster.

== Selected publications ==
In addition to her work in books, Blaisdell made illustrations for periodicals including The American Parade.

- Falcon Fly Back (1938, writer and illustrator)
- Elizabeth: The Tudor Princess by Marian King (1940, illustrator)
- God's Troubadour by Sophie Jewett (1940, illustrator)
- Stories of King Arthur (1941, illustrator)
- Theodosia: Daughter of Aaron Burr by Anne Colver (1941, illustrator)
- Boy of the Woods: The Story of John James Audubon by Maie Lounsbury Wells and Dorothy Fox (1942, illustrator)
- The Emperor's Nephew by Marian W. Magoon (1942, illustrator)
- Grubby Gets Clean by Mary Ellen Vorse (1943, illustrator)
- Tales from Shakespeare by Charles Lamb and Mary Lamb (1943, illustrator)
- Little Women by Louisa May Alcott (1946 edition, illustrator)
- The Double Birthday Present by Mabel Leigh Hunt (1947, illustrator)
- Bulfinch's Mythology (1947, illustrator)
- Rhymes and Verses: Collected Poems for Young People by Walter de la Mare (1947, illustrator)
- Tales of the Undead: Vampires and Visitants (1947, editor and illustrator)
- The Real Book About Abraham Lincoln by Michael Gorham (1951, illustrator)

== Personal life ==
She married writer Melrich "Mike" Vonelm Rosenberg in 1928. Rosenberg died in 1937, when he was 33 years old. Blaisdell died in 1994, at age 94, in Lancaster.
