= Six Songs from A Shropshire Lad =

Song cycle composed in 1911 by George Butterworth

Six Songs from A Shropshire Lad is a song cycle for baritone and piano composed in 1911 by George Butterworth (1885–1916). It consists of settings of six poems from A. E. Housman's 1896 collection A Shropshire Lad.

Butterworth set another five poems from A Shropshire Lad in Bredon Hill and Other Songs (1912). Nine of the eleven songs were premiered at Oxford on 16 May 1911, by James Campbell McInnes (baritone) and the composer (piano). The following month, the six songs which make up the present cycle were performed in London, with McInnes as singer and Hamilton Harty as accompanist.

A performance typically takes 14 minutes. The songs are as follows; the Roman numerals are from A Shropshire Lad:

1. II "Loveliest of Trees"
2. XIII "When I Was One-and-Twenty"
3. XV "Look Not In My eyes"
4. XLIX "Think No More, Lad"
5. XXIII "The Lads in Their Hundreds"
6. XXVII "Is My Team Ploughing?"

According to the music historian A. V. Butcher, Butterworth "was intimately concerned with the collecting and editing of folksongs, and he found a traditional tune in the Dorian mode which could be happily wedded to 'When I was one-and-twenty'." No such tune has, however, been identified.
