= The Banks of Green Willow =

1913 composition by George Butterworth

The tune as noted by Butterworth from the singing of Mr & Mrs Cranstone of Billingshurst, Sussex, in June 1907. It varies in several respects from that used in the orchestral work of 1913.

The Banks of Green Willow is a piece of orchestral music by British composer George Butterworth. It was composed in 1913, is written in the key of A major, and is around six minutes long.

== Composition ==
This is a short orchestral piece by George Butterworth, probably the most played of his three works for orchestra. It has certainly been his most recorded orchestral work.

Described by its composer as an "Idyll", it is scored for a small orchestra consisting of two flutes, two oboes, two clarinets, two bassoons, two horns, one trumpet, harp and strings. It is thus a belated companion to the Two English Idylls of 1910–1911. All three pieces are founded on folk melodies Butterworth collected in Sussex in 1907, each has a similar "arch" shape, and each lasts between 4½ and 6 minutes.

Butterworth based The Banks of Green Willow on two folk song melodies that he noted in 1907 – "The Banks of Green Willow" (Child 24, Roud 172) and "Green Bushes" (Roud 1040, Laws P2). The first was noted from the singing of "Mr & Mrs Cranstone" of Billingshurst, though a few bars from the end (after the flute and harp have played Green Bushes) a solo violin muses on a variant of the tune, recorded by Butterworth in 1909, using a phonograph, from the singing of David Clements in a Basingstoke Workhouse (and available on the British Library Sound Archive website). Versions of the second tune were noted from at least ten different singers, though the tune as it appears in the Idyll is not any of them. Each use of each tune varies slightly, and it is likely that Butterworth created new variants based on features of all the various versions he collected. Green Bushes as it appears in the Idyll most closely resembles that sung by Ned Harding of Lower Beeding, Sussex, in June 1907. It is interesting that the composer also noted a version from Mr Cranstone, though it is not much like the one in the Idyll. Green Bushes was a common tune, and there are notable uses of it in works by Ralph Vaughan Williams (Folk Song Suite, Movement 2) and Percy Grainger (Passacaglia: Green Bushes and The Lost Lady Found).

A solo clarinet and strings create a pastoral scene with the title theme, followed by a short development and restatement of the tune. The mood becomes more sombre and agitated as a new theme (Butterworth's own, on horns) is introduced. An animated motif leads to the main climax, which is surprisingly passionate for such a short work, before the music subsides to introduce Green Bushes hesitantly on oboe. This is repeated gently on flute, accompanied by harp, and the piece ends tranquilly with snatches of the variant title theme on violin solo, horn and oboe.

As the composer said this piece is a "musical illustration to the ballad of the same name", it may be useful to realise that the folk ballad tells the tale of a farmer's daughter who falls in love with a young sea-captain, becomes pregnant and runs away with him to sea, having first stolen money from her parents. When her child is born on board ship, the labour is especially difficult and there is no "woman's help" available. Knowing she will die, she asks her lover to "bind a napkin round my head, then throw me overboard, both me and my baby" Her lover does this and watches as she "quivers" – presumably in her death-throes – and he sings a lament to "my true love, whom I once loved so dearly" and who shall be buried on "The Banks of Green Willow" (Butterworth's capitalisation). It is a shocking tale, even more so in other collected versions, where it is the man who decides to throw the girl and baby overboard rather than risk the shame of taking them home (Mr & Mrs Cranstone's text is a little more palatable).

The premiere of The Banks of Green Willow took place on 27 February 1914, when Adrian Boult conducted a combined orchestra of forty members of the Hallé and Liverpool orchestras in West Kirby. This was, in fact, the 24-year-old conductor’s first concert with a professional orchestra (he also gave the British premiere of Hugo Wolf's Italian Serenade at the same concert). The London premiere took place three weeks later, and seems to have been the last occasion Butterworth heard his own music.

Butterworth was killed on 5 August 1916, during the Battle of the Somme. He was aged 31, and was a Lieutenant in the Durham Light Infantry. His body has never been recovered.

== Recorded history ==
- Maurice Miles/Philharmonia Orchestra (1946)
- Sir Adrian Boult/London Philharmonic Orchestra (1954)
- Sir Adrian Boult/London Philharmonic Orchestra (1969)
- Neville Dilkes/English Sinfonia (1971)
- Sir Adrian Boult/London Philharmonic Orchestra (1973)
- Sir Neville Marriner/Academy of St Martin in the Fields (1975)
- André Previn/London Symphony Orchestra (1976)
- Norman Del Mar/Bournemouth Sinfonietta (1978)
- Jeffrey Tate/English Chamber Orchestra (1987)
- William Boughton/English String Orchestra (1988)
- Sir Charles Groves/English Chamber Orchestra (1989)
- Grant Llewellyn/Royal Liverpool Philharmonic (1991)
- Kenneth Page/ Orchestra Da Camera (1996)
- Richard Hickox/London Symphony Orchestra (2000)
- Sir Mark Elder/Hallé Orchestra (2002)
- Christopher Warren-Green/Royal Philharmonic Orchestra(2004)

== Modern representations ==
The popular piece is often used in TV adverts with wholesome panoramic views of the British countryside, for products such as dog food and life insurance, as well as being a favourite of Classic FM.

There are many variant folk songs by the same name. A 2003 novel by the Irish writer Kevin Myers also has the title.

== Other versions ==
- Piano solo, arranged by John Mitchell (Thames Publishing).
- Brass band, arranged by Phillip Brookes (Pabmusic, 1972); arranged by Duncan Wilson
- Recorded by the Ukulele Orchestra of Great Britain; arranged by George Hinchcliffe, on album Lousy War, 2016
