= Love Blows As the Wind Blows =

Love Blows As the Wind Blows is a song cycle for voice and piano or string quartet composed in 1911–12 by George Butterworth (1885–1916). It sets four poems by William Ernest Henley from his Book of Verses (1888). The composer orchestrated three songs from the cycle in 1914, omitting "Fill a Glass with Golden Wine".

A performance typically takes 12 minutes. The songs are as follows:

1. "In the Year That's Come and Gone"
2. "Life in Her Creaking Shoes"
3. "Fill a Glass with Golden Wine"
4. "On the Way to Kew"
