= The Land of Lost Content (book) =

Book by Mark Peel

The Land of Lost Content: the Biography of Anthony Chenevix-Trench
- Author: Mark Peel
- Language: English
- Publisher: The Pentland Press
- Publication date: 1 May 1996
- Publication place: United Kingdom
- Pages: 249
- ISBN: 9781858214009

The Land of Lost Content: the Biography of Anthony Chenevix-Trench is a biographical book about the life of British headmaster Anthony Chenevix-Trench, written by Mark Peel. Chenevix-Trench had been a widely acclaimed teacher at Shrewsbury School, and subsequently headmaster at Bradfield College, Eton College and Fettes College, but was later criticised for his approach to corporal punishment. Published by Pentland Press in 1996, the book received mixed reviews, with questions over its neutrality and writing style, but plaudits for its insights into British culture and education.

The book's title is taken from Poem XL in A. E. Housman's collection A Shropshire Lad.

== Background ==
Chenevix-Trench was known for his substantial tenures as headmaster of Bradfield College, Eton College and Fettes College; he had also taught at Shrewsbury School. He died in 1979. In 1994, a book by Tim Card, a former Vice-Provost of Eton, revealed for the first time that Chenevix-Trench had not left his position as headmaster of Eton of his own accord. There followed some newspaper articles critical of Chenevix-Trench's use of corporal punishment, and numerous letters to the editor in response, most of which were positive about Chenevix-Trench's legacy. Peel, a teacher at Fettes College at the time, published The Land of Lost Content two years later.

== Content ==
The book is divided into seven chapters, respectively covering Chenevix-Trench's ancestry and early childhood, his education at Shrewsbury School and Christ Church, Oxford, his military service in the Malayan Campaign during the Second World War, and his successive spells of teaching at Shrewsbury, Bradfield, Eton and Fettes. A five-page postscript entitled merely "Tony Chenevix-Trench" draws conclusions. There is also a five-page introduction, and a three-page foreword by Sir William Gladstone. The Land of Lost Content is the title of a poem from A.E. Housman's 1896 cycle A Shropshire Lad, which Chenevix-Trench translated into Latin while a prisoner of the Japanese during the Second World War.

In Peel's view, Bradfield, Eton and Fettes all saw Chenevix-Trench become headmaster at "critical points in their history", and he was "a headmaster whose personality met many of their priorities, breathing fresh life into creaking limbs". The book argues that, despite Chenevix-Trench's shortcomings being "too readily obvious", "overshadowing the flaws stands his passionate concern for the individual, a vital quality for any leader to possess".

The book ends with a quotation from Chenevix-Trench about the importance of education:

What is a boy? He is a person who is going to carry on what you have started, to sit where you are sitting and, when you are gone, attend to those things you think are so important. You can adopt all the policies you please, but how they will be carried on depends on him. Even if you make leagues and treaties, he will have to manage them. He will assume control of your cities and nations. He is going to move on and take over your prisons, churches, schools, universities and corporations.

All your work is going to be judged by him. Your reputation and the future are in his hands. All your work is for him, and the fate of nations and humanity is also in his hands.

So it might be well to pay him some attention now.

== Reception ==
The book received a mixed reception from critics. Writing in The Daily Telegraph, Ludovic Kennedy said that the book describes Chenevix-Trench's career with considerable "affection", while not shying away from revealing "many uncomfortable home truths". Kennedy has a few "quibbles" with the book, particularly its over-use of clichés, but concludes that Chenevix-Trench, who he said "never bore a grudge", would have approved despite the flaws. Kennedy also titles his review with the words of Chenevix-Trench, who joked of his own tenure at Eton—"endearingly", according to Kennedy—"In some ways I'm too small a man in too big a job."

Another positive voice was Lorn Macintyre, writing in the Herald, who said that the book gives "an honest insight into the public school system with all its imperfections". He further comments that although Peel reveals some things that are "disturbing", he also shows Chenevix-Trench's "dedication to high academic standards, to the all-round development of a young person despite his use of the rod".

Paul Foot wrote a personal recollection for the Diary page of the London Review of Books describing the book as "a wretched hagiography, full of clichés and bad jokes", and objected to its portrayal of Chenevix-Trench as "a heroic figure".
