= A Shropshire Lad =

1896 poetry collection by A. E. Housman

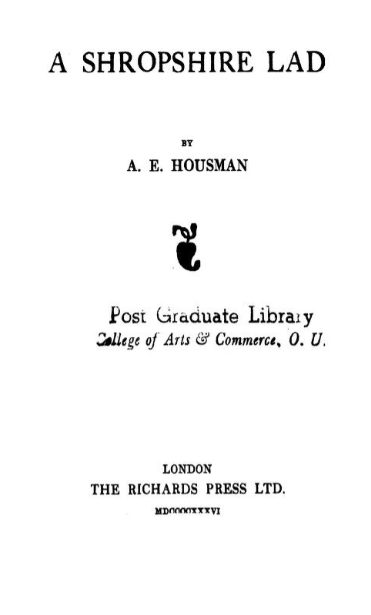
- Title page for A Shropshire Lad (1896)
- Author: Alfred Edward Housman
- Illustrator: William Hyde (1908 Ballantyne Press edition)
- Language: English
- Genre: Poetry
- Publication date: 1896
- Publication place: England
- Media type: Print
- Dewey Decimal: 821.8
- LC Class: PR4809.H15
- Followed by: Last Poems
- Text: A Shropshire Lad at Wikisource

A Shropshire Lad is a collection of 63 poems by the English poet A. E. Housman, published in 1896. Selling slowly at first, it then rapidly grew in popularity, particularly among young readers. Composers began setting the poems to music less than ten years after their first appearance, and many parodists have satirised Housman's themes and poetic style.

== A Shropshire rhapsody ==
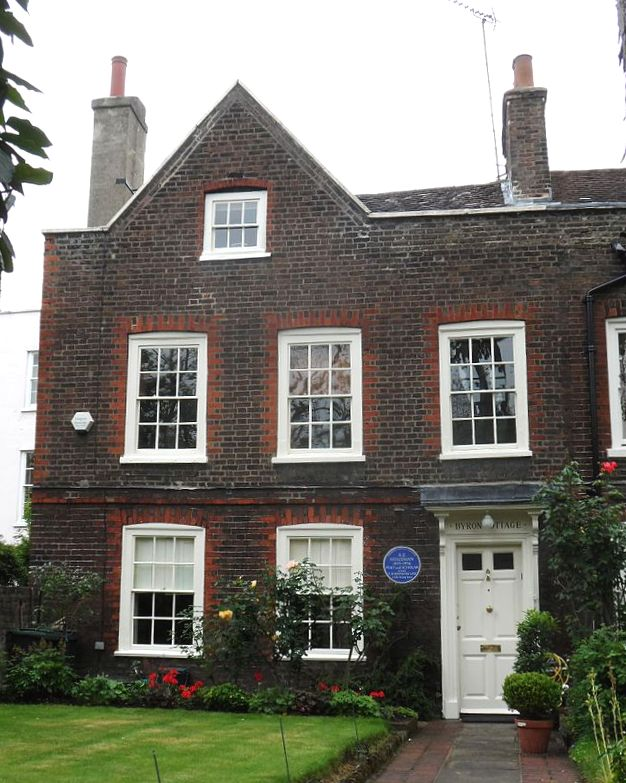
Byron Cottage in Highgate, where Housman wrote A Shropshire Lad

Housman is said originally to have titled his book The Poems of Terence Hearsay, referring to a character there, but changed the title to A Shropshire Lad at the suggestion of a colleague in the British Museum. A friend of his remembered otherwise, however, and claimed that A Shropshire Lad was always Housman's choice of title. He had more than a year to think about it, since most of the poems he chose to include in his collection were written in 1895, while he was living at Byron Cottage in Highgate. The book was published the following year, partly at the author's expense, after it had already been rejected by one publisher.

At first the book sold slowly; the initial printing of 500 copies, some 160 of which were sent to the United States, did not clear until 1898. Sales revived during the Second Boer War (1899–1902), due in part to the prominence of military themes and of dying young. Its popularity increased thereafter, especially during World War I, when the book accompanied many young men into the trenches but it also benefited from the accessibility that Housman encouraged himself. Initially he declined royalty payments, so as to keep the price down, and also encouraged small, cheap pocket (and even waistcoat pocket) editions. By 1911 sales were at an annual average of 13,500 copies, and by its fiftieth anniversary there had been approaching a hundred UK and US editions.

Housman later repeated the claim made in the final poem of the sequence (LXIII) to have had a young male readership in mind. For W. H. Auden and his generation "no other poet seemed so perfectly to express the sensibility of a male adolescent"; and George Orwell remembered that, among his generation at Eton College in the wake of World War I, "these were the poems which I and my contemporaries used to recite to ourselves, over and over, in a kind of ecstasy". They responded to Housman's lament for the transience of love, idealism and youth in what was in essence a half-imaginary pastoral countryside in a county only visited by him after he had begun writing the poems. "I was born in Worcestershire, not Shropshire, where I have never spent much time," he admitted later in a letter to Maurice Pollet dated 5 February 1933. "I had a sentimental feeling for Shropshire because its hills were on our Western horizon." Thus the "blue remembered hills" of his "land of lost content" in Poem XL are mostly a literary construct. Though the names there can be found on the map, their topographical details are admittedly not factual.

Indeed, Housman confessed in his letter to Pollett that "I know Ludlow and Wenlock, but my topographical details – Hughley, Abdon under Clee – are sometimes quite wrong". He did, however, have one source to guide him, echoes from which are to be found in the poems. This was Murray's Handbook for Shropshire, Cheshire and Lancashire (originally published in 1870), in which is to be found the jingle with which poem L opens,

Clunton and Clunbury,
Clungunford and Clun,
Are the quietest places
Under the sun.

Shrewsbury is described in the book as "encircled by the Severn on all sides but the North, and locally termed 'the Island'", which Housman condenses to "Islanded in Severn stream" in his poem XXVIII. Murray also mentions that the last fair of the year at Church Stretton is called 'Dead Man's Fair', the event with which "In midnights of November" begins. Written about the same time as the others, this poem was held over until it was incorporated in Last Poems (1922).

In the letter to Pollet already mentioned, Housman pointed out that there was a discontinuity between the Classical scholar who wrote the poems and the "imaginary" Shropshire Lad they portrayed. "No doubt I have been unconsciously influenced by the Greeks and Latins, but [the] chief sources of which I am conscious are Shakespeare's songs, the Scottish Border ballads, and Heine." Yet while it is true that "very little in the book is biographical", he could not entirely escape his literary formation, as he had already speculated in a letter written three decades previously. "I suppose my classical training has been of some use to me in furnishing good models, and making me fastidious, and telling me what to leave out." Nevertheless, some have found a sign in the oversimplification that results, not of Terence's but of Housman's own emotional immaturity.

== Thematic summary ==
A Shropshire Lad contains several repeated themes. It is not a connected narrative; though the "I" of the poems is in two cases named as Terence (VIII, LXII), the "Shropshire Lad" of the title, he is not to be identified with Housman himself. Not all the poems are in the same voice and there are various kinds of dialogue between the speaker and others, including conversations beyond the grave.

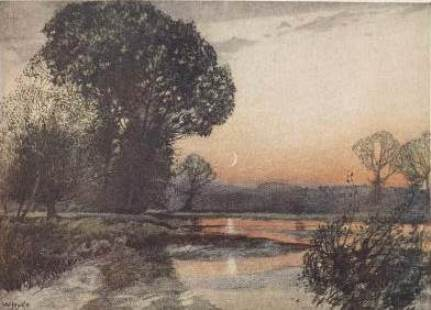
"On the Teme", one of William Hyde's coloured illustrations for A Shropshire Lad (1908)

The collection begins with an imperial theme by paying tribute to the Shropshire lads who have died as soldiers in the service of The Queen Empress, as her golden jubilee (1887) is celebrated with a beacon bonfire on Clee Hill (I). There is little time for a lad to live and enjoy the spring (II). Death awaits the soldier (III–IV). Maids are not always kind (V–VI) and the farmer also comes to the grave (VII). Some lads murder their brothers and are hanged (VIII–IX). The spring's promise of love and renewal may be false (X). The ghost of a lad dead of grief begs the consolation of a last embrace (XI). Unattainable love leaves the lad helpless and lost (XIII–XVI). The playing of a game of cricket or football consoles a broken heart (XVII). But on this dubious sentiment Edith Sitwell commented acidly, "If he means to say that cricket, and cricket alone, has prevented men from committing suicide, then their continuation on this earth seems hardly worthwhile."

Continuing this theme, the athlete who died young was lucky, for he did not outlive his renown (XIX). The poet exchanges a glance with a marching soldier and wishes him well, thinking they will never cross paths again (XXII). He envies the country lads who die young and do not grow old (XXIII). Seize the day, then, to cultivate friendship (XXIV). A lover may die, and his girl will walk out with another (XXV–XXVII). The hostility of the ancient Saxon and Briton are in his blood, and he owes his life to violence and rape (XXVIII). The storm on Wenlock Edge symbolizes the same turmoil in his soul as the Romans knew at Wroxeter (XXXI). Man is a chance combination of elements – make the most of him while there is time! (XXXII) If he is of no use to those he loves, he will leave, perhaps to enlist as a soldier (XXXIV, XXXV).

One may live in distant exile in London, but without forgetting home and friends (XXXVII, XXXVIII). The wind sighs across England to him from Shropshire, but he will not see the broom flowering gold on Wenlock Edge (XXXVIII–XL). London is full of cold-hearted men who fear and hate one another, but he will make the best of life while he has a living will (XLIII). The suicide is wise, for he prefers to die cleanly rather than harm others and live in shame (XLIV–XLV). These two poems were suggested by a report on the death of a naval cadet in August 1895 who had left behind him a letter mentioning these reasons for taking his own life. Bring no living branches to the grave of such a one, but only what will never flower again (XLVI). A carpenter's son once died on the gallows so that other lads might live (XLVII). He was happy before he was born, but he will endure life for a while: the cure for all sorrows will come in time (XLVIII). If crowded and noisy London has its troubles, so do quiet Clun and Knighton, and the only cure for any of them is the grave (L).

Though he is in London, his spirit wanders about his home fields (LII). From the grave the suicide's ghost visits the beloved (LIII), a theme apparently derived from a traditional ballad of the unquiet grave type. Those he loved are dead, and other youths eternally re-live his own experiences (LV). Like the lad that becomes a soldier, one can choose to face death young rather than put it off out of cowardice (LVI). Dick is in the graveyard, and Ned is long in jail, when he returns by himself to Ludlow (LVIII). Take your pack and go: death will be a journey into eternal night (LX). It matters not if he sleeps among the suicides, or among those who died well – they were all his friends (LXI). Some mock his melancholy thoughts but he has used them like the poisons sampled by Mithridates and will survive to die old (LXII). Perhaps these poems are not fashionable, but they survive the poet to please other lads like him (LXIII).

== Interpretations ==
=== Song settings ===
The strong combination of emotional feeling, lyricism and folk qualities contributed to the popularity of A Shropshire Lad with composers. All but eight poems in the collection have been set to music, and eleven of them in ten or more settings. Among the latter, "Loveliest of trees, the cherry now" (II) has 47 settings and "When I Was One-and-Twenty" (XIII) has 44.

Several composers wrote song cycles in which the poems, taken out of their sequence in the collection, contrast with each other or combine in a narrative dialogue. In a few cases they wrote more than one work using this material. The earliest, performed in 1904, less than ten years after the collection's first appearance, was Arthur Somervell's Song Cycle from A Shropshire Lad in which ten were set for baritone and piano. There are six songs in Ralph Vaughan Williams' On Wenlock Edge (1909) in settings which include piano and string quartet; there was also an orchestral version in 1924. Later he returned to Housman again for another cycle, a first version of which was performed in 1927 with solo violin accompaniment, but in this only four were taken from A Shropshire Lad, along with three from Last Poems (1922). The revised work was eventually published in 1954 as Along the Field: 8 Housman songs; in the meantime, "The Soldier" (XXII) was dropped and two more added from Last Poems.

Among other cycles composed during the period before World War 1 were the four Songs of A Shropshire Lad by Graham Peel and the six for voice and piano in A Shropshire Lad: A Song Cycle (Op. 22, 1911) by Charles Fonteyn Manney (1872–1951). George Butterworth was particularly drawn to Housman's poems, composing within a short period the Six Songs from A Shropshire Lad (1911) and Bredon Hill and Other Songs (1912) as well as his emotive Rhapsody, A Shropshire Lad, first performed in 1913. Butterworth was killed during the war, but towards the end of it Ivor Gurney was working on the songs in his cycle, Ludlow and Teme (1919), and later went on to compose the eight poems in The Western Playland (1921). Ernest John Moeran was another combatant in the war and afterwards set the four songs in his Ludlow Town (1920).

During the immediate postwar period, two other composers made extensive use of the poems in A Shropshire Lad. John Ireland included six poems for piano and tenor in The Land of Lost Content (1921). His We'll to the woods no more (1928) includes two poems for voice and piano taken from Last Poems and a purely instrumental epilogue titled "Spring will not wait", which is based on "'Tis time, I think, by Wenlock town" from A Shropshire Lad (XXXIX). Charles Wilfred Orr, who made 24 Housman settings, united some in cycles of two (1921–1922), seven (1934) and three songs (1940). Lennox Berkeley's 5 Housman Songs (Op.14/3, 1940) also dates from the start of World War II. Another cycle composed since then has been the five in Mervyn Horder's A Shropshire Lad (1980).

Composers outside the UK have also set individual poems by Housman. Several were from the US, including Samuel Barber, who set "With rue my heart is laden" (as the second of his "3 Songs", Op. 2, 1928), David Van Vactor, Ned Rorem, and John Woods Duke. Other Americans composed song cycles: Alan Leichtling in 11 songs from A Shropshire Lad, set for baritone and chamber orchestra (Op. 50, 1969); Robert F. Baksa (b. 1938) who set eleven in his Housman Songs (1981); and the Canadian Nick Peros who set seven. Outside America, the Polish Henryk Górecki set four songs and Mayme Chanwai (born Hong Kong, 1939) set two. One of the most recent is the Argentinian Juan María Solare's arrangement of poem XL for voice and drum, titled "Lost Content" (2004).

=== Illustrations ===
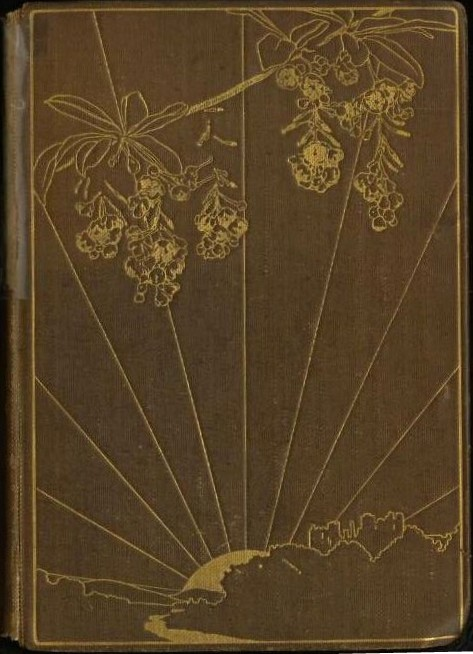
The first illustrated edition of A Shropshire Lad (1908), cover design by William Hyde

The first illustrated edition of A Shropshire Lad was published in 1908, with eight county landscapes by William Hyde. Those did not meet with Housman's approval, however: "They were in colour, which always looks vulgar," he reported. The poet was dead by the time of the 1940 Harrap edition, which carried monochrome woodcuts by Agnes Miller Parker. It proved so popular that frequent reprintings followed and latterly other presses have recycled the illustrations as well. The example of rather traditional woodcuts was also taken up in the US in the Peter Pauper Press edition (Mount Vernon, NY, 1942) with its 'scenic decorations' by Aldren Watson (1917–2013); that too saw later reprintings. Other American editions have included the Illustrated Editions issue (New York, 1932) with drawings by Elinore Blaisdell (1900–94) and the Heritage Press edition (New York, 1935) with coloured woodcuts by Edward A. Wilson (1886–1970). Single poems from the collection have also been illustrated in a distinctive style by the lithographer Richard Vicary.

=== Translations ===
Translations of poems from all of Housman's collections into Classical Greek and Latin have been made since he first appeared as an author. The earliest was of poem XV in Greek elegiacs, published in the Classical Review for 1897. Some thirty more appeared between then and 1969. Included among these were Cyril Asquith's 12 Poems from A Shropshire Lad (Oxford 1929) and those by L. W. de Silva in his Latin Elegiac Versions (London 1966).

=== Parodies ===
The repeated mannerisms, lilting style and generally black humour of Housman's collection have made it an easy target for parody. The first to set the fashion was Housman himself in "Terence, this is stupid stuff" (LXII) with its humorously voiced criticism of the effect of his writing and the wry justification of his stance in the tale of Mithridates. He was followed early in the new century by Ezra Pound, whose "Mr Housman's Message" appeared in his collection Canzoni (1911). A poem of three stanzas, it begins with a glum acknowledgement of mortality:

O woe, woe,
People are born and die,
We also shall be dead pretty soon
Therefore let us act as if we were
dead already.

— lines 1–5

In the same year Rupert Brooke sent a parody of twelve quatrains to The Westminster Gazette (13 May 1911), written on learning of Housman's appointment as Kennedy Professor of Latin at Cambridge University. These began, in imitation of the opening of poem L,

Emmanuel, and Magdalene,
And St Catharine's, and St John's,
Are the dreariest of places,
And full of dons.

Max Beerbohm joined in the fun a decade later with six lines beginning

And now, lad, all is over,
'Twixt you, your love, and the clover;

written into the 1920 edition of A Shropshire Lad. They were followed by Hugh Kingsmill's "Two poems after A. E. Housman". The first of these, beginning

What, still alive at twenty-two,
A clean upstanding chap like you?

— lines 1–2

is frequently quoted still and was described by Housman in a letter dated 19 September 1925 as "the best [parody] I have seen, and indeed the only good one." The second by Kingsmill keeps equally closely to Housman's themes and vocabulary and has the same mix of macabre humour:

'Tis Summer Time on Bredon,
And now the farmers swear:
The cattle rise and listen
In valleys far and near,
And blush at what they hear.

But when the mists in autumn
On Bredon top are thick,
And happy hymns of farmers
Go up from fold and rick,
The cattle then are sick.

Humbert Wolfe's "A. E. Housman and a few friends" is almost as often quoted as Kingsmill's first parody. Written in 1939, its humour is equally black and critical of Housman's typical themes:

When lads have done with labour
In Shropshire, one will cry,
"Let's go and kill a neighbour,"
And t'other answers "Aye!"

— Stanza 1

"Loveliest of trees, the cherry now" (II) has twice come in for parody. Dorothy Parker returned it to the context of suicide so prevalent in A Shropshire Lad, and included it under the title "Cherry White" in her collected poems, Not So Deep as a Well (1936):

I never see that prettiest thing—
A cherry bough gone white with Spring—
But what I think, "How gay t'would be
To hang me from a flowering tree."

A new context is also found for Housman's celebratory tone as "Loveliest of cheese, the Cheddar now" by Terence Beersay, a pseudonym claimed to conceal "a literary figure of some note" in the preface to an 8-page booklet titled The Shropshire Lag (1936).

Kingsley Amis too acknowledges that there is more to Housman's writing than the monotonously macabre. His later "A.E.H." is more of "an admiring imitation, not a parody," and reproduces the effect of Housman's mellifluous rejoicing in nature and skilful versifying:

Flame the westward skies adorning
Leaves no like on holt or hill;
Sounds of battle joined at morning
Wane and wander and are still.

— Stanza 1

Another parodic approach is to deal with the subject of one poem in the style of another. This will only work when both are equally well known, as is the case with Louis Untermeyer's subversion of heterosexual relations between Shropshire youth in "Georgie, Porgie, pudding and pie fashioned after A.E. Housman".

== Legacy ==
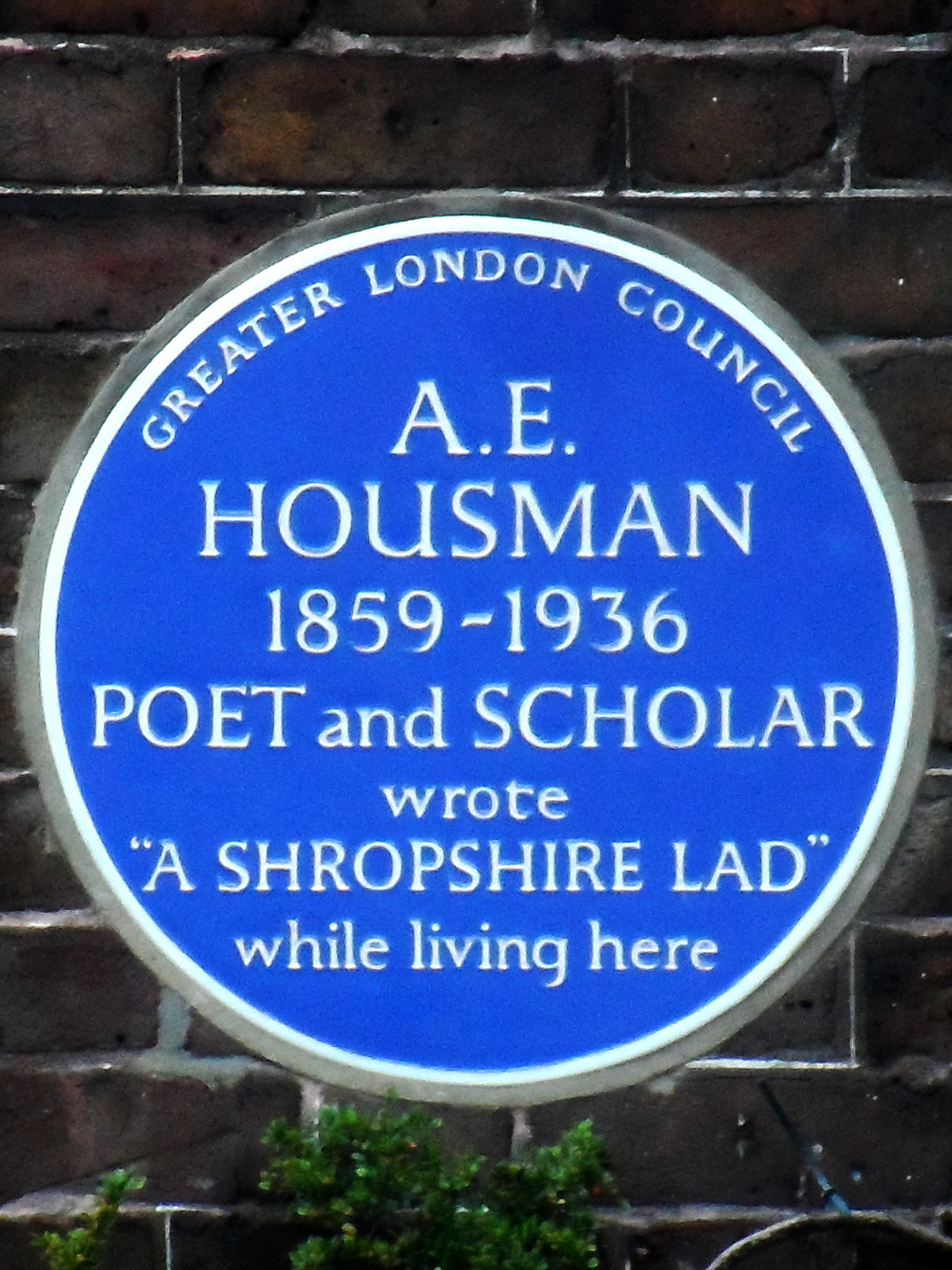
The Blue Plaque on Byron Cottage

There have been numerous literary references to A Shropshire Lad, often with characters in novels or dramas quoting a few lines or even whole poems.

Since Housman's ashes were interred at St Laurence Church, Ludlow, it was visited in 1996 by the City of Birmingham Symphony Orchestra to celebrate the centenary of A Shropshire Lad. A wall hanging named after the book is now displayed near the south door there. The book's centenary was also celebrated by Wood's Shropshire Brewery, when they named their bitter after it. In the same year, a pink climbing rose with a strong fragrance, bred by David Austin, was also named after the book.

Later, the collection was commemorated by the short-lived Wrexham & Shropshire railway company (2008–11), which named one of its Class 67 engines A Shropshire Lad. After closure, the nameplate was auctioned in 2015.

== Bibliography ==
- Peter Edgerly Firchow, Reluctant Modernists, LIT Verlag Münster 2002, pp. 7–26
- Trevor Hold, Parry to Finzi: Twenty English Song-composers, Woodbridge 2002
- Lieder Net Archive (LNA)
- George Orwell, Inside the Whale, 1940; University of Adelaide e-book, section 2
- Peter Parker, Housman Country, London 2016
- Donna Richardson, "The Can of Ail: A. E. Housman's Moral Irony," Victorian Poetry, Volume 48, Number 2, Summer 2010 (267–85)
- Richard Stokes, The Penguin Book of English Song, 2016
- Gilmore Warner, "The 50th anniversary of A Shropshire Lad", Colby Quarterly 1/14, March 1946, pp. 217–32
