= Richard Vicary =

British artist and printmaker

Richard Vicary (8 July 1918 – 8 August 2006) was a British artist and printmaker.

He was born in Sutton, Surrey, UK on 8 July 1918. His father was the clergyman W. W. Vicary who also wrote novels under the pseudonym Simon Jesty.

He studied at Tunbridge Wells School of Art and Medway School of Art (Maidstone), where he stayed until the start of the war in 1939.

Much of his teaching career was spent at Shrewsbury School of Art, where he taught until 1972.

Vicary was particularly known for his lithographic landscape prints, influenced by the British neo-romantic painters and printmakers such as Graham Sutherland, Ceri Richards and John Piper.

He died on 8 August 2006 aged 88.

== Bibliography ==
- The Manual in Lithography (1976)
- The Advanced Manual in Lithography (1977)
- The Ivy Garland (1982) – as illustrator
