= George Ritchie Kinloch =

Scottish lawyer, philanthropist and antiquarian

George Ritchie Kinloch (c. 1796 – 19 April 1877) was a Scottish lawyer, philanthropist and antiquarian best known today for publishing a collection of ballads.

== Life ==
Kinloch was probably born in Jamaica, the sixth of a family of eight, where his father George Kinloch was serving as Deputy Judge Advocate with the Portland Regiment and as a Master of Chancery. The family soon returned to Stonehaven, Kincardineshire, Scotland; where his father died 22 April 1802, aged 60. Educated as a lawyer, George Ritchie Kinloch worked as a clerk for several advocates depute. Later he was employed by George Cranstoun. He was appointed assistant registrar of deeds at Edinburgh in 1842, and served as registrar of deeds from 1851 to 1869. He was the treasurer of the Patterson and Pope relief fund for the poor for many years.

== Literary career ==
Kinloch's assistance in compiling the supplementary volumes of Jamieson's dictionary (1825) was acknowledged by the author. In 1827 he published his Ancient Scottish Ballads, Recovered from tradition, listed by Sir Walter Scott among the "more important" of later collections of ballads. A Ballad Book published the same year was republished in 1885. He also edited in 1830 several seventeenth-century Scottish texts for the Maitland Club and in 1837 one for the Abbotsford Club. He published a Reliquiæ Antiquæ Scoticæ in 1848.
