= George Butterworth =

English composer (1885–1916)

George Butterworth MC
- George Butterworth, c. 1914
- Born: George Sainton Kaye Butterworth; 12 July 1885; Paddington, London, England
- Died: 5 August 1916 (aged 31); Pozières, Somme, France
- Cause of death: Killed in action
- Resting place: Unknown
- Education: Aysgarth School Trinity College, Oxford
- Occupations: Composer, schoolmaster, music critic, professional morris dancer, soldier
- Parent(s): Sir Alexander Kaye Butterworth; Julia Marguerite Wigan
- Relatives: Joseph Butterworth (great great grandfather); Hugh Butterworth (cousin)
- Military career
- Allegiance: United Kingdom
- Branch: British Army
- Service years: 1914–1916
- Rank: Subaltern
- Units: 13th Battalion, Durham Light Infantry
- Conflicts: First World War: Battle of the Somme †; Battle of Pozieres (WIA)

George Sainton Kaye Butterworth, MC (12 July 1885 – 5 August 1916) was an English composer who was best known for the orchestral idyll The Banks of Green Willow and his song settings of A. E. Housman's poems from A Shropshire Lad. He was awarded the Military Cross for his gallantry during the fighting at the Battle of Pozières in the First World War, and died during the Battle of the Somme.

== Early years ==
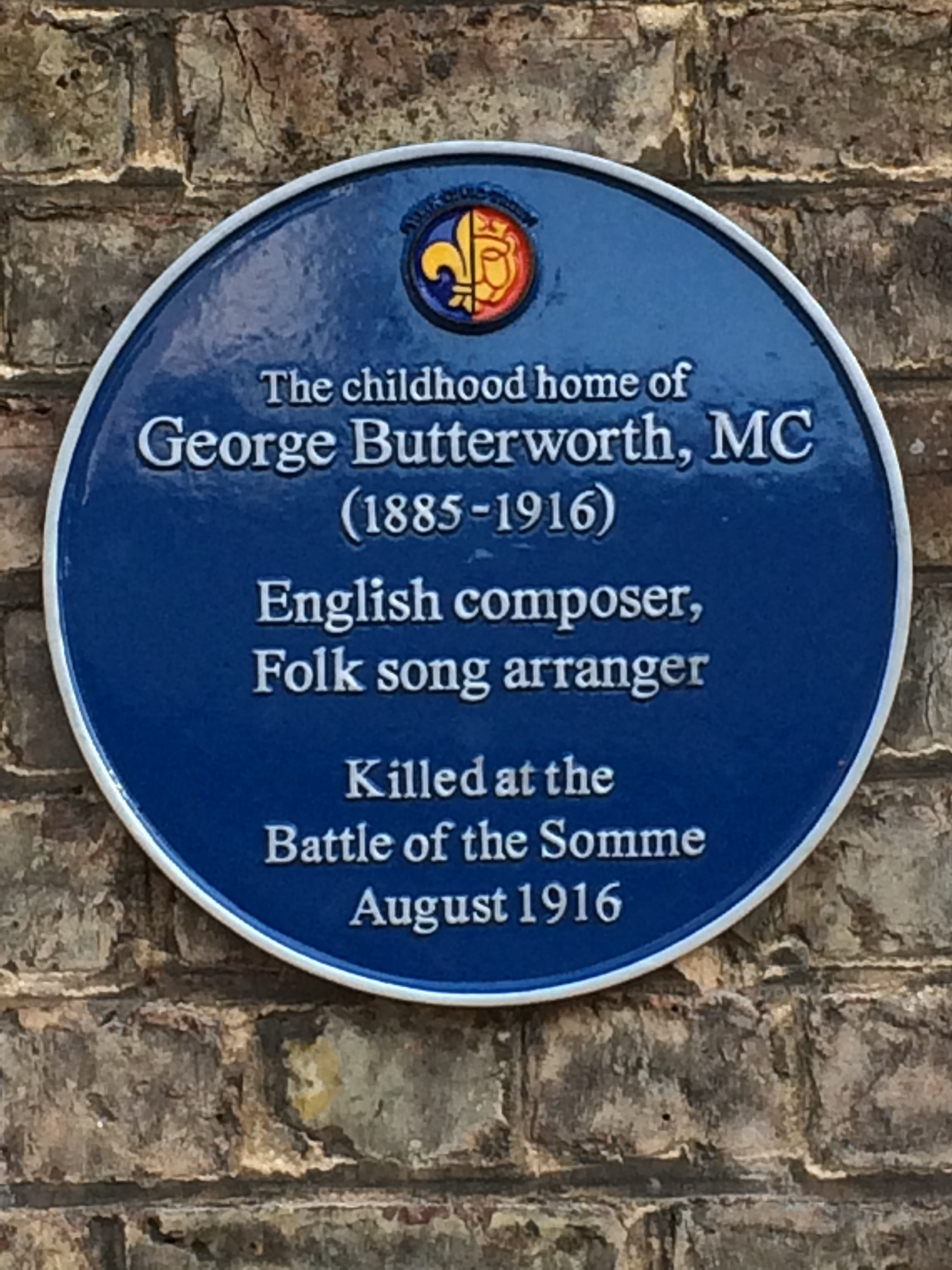
Blue plaque commemorating Butterworth's childhood home in Driffield Terrace, York

Butterworth was born in Paddington, London. Soon after his birth, his family moved to York so that his father, Sir Alexander Kaye Butterworth, could take up an appointment as general manager of the North Eastern Railway, which was based there. They lived at "Riseholme," a house on Driffield Terrace, which later became part of the Mount School. In 2016, the centenary year of Butterworth's death on the Somme, biographer Anthony Murphy, on behalf of the York Civic Trust, unveiled a blue plaque to his memory at College House, part of the Mount School.

Butterworth received his first music lessons from his mother, who was a singer, and he began composing at an early age. As a young boy, he played the organ for services in the chapel of his preparatory school, Aysgarth School. He gained a scholarship to Eton College, where he showed early musical promise, and a barcarolle for orchestra, long since lost, was played during his time there.

Butterworth then went up to Trinity College, Oxford, where he became more focused on music, becoming president of the University Music Club. He also made friends with the folk song collector Cecil Sharp, the composer and folk song enthusiast Ralph Vaughan Williams, the future Director of the Royal College of Music, Hugh Allen, and a baritone and future conductor, Adrian Boult.

Butterworth and Vaughan Williams made several trips into the English countryside to collect folk songs. Butterworth collected over 450 himself, many in Sussex in 1907, and sometimes using a phonograph, and the compositions of both men were strongly influenced by what they collected. Butterworth was also an expert folk dancer, being particularly keen in the art of morris dancing. He was employed for a while as a professional morris dancer by the English Folk Dance and Song Society, of which he was a founder member in 1906, and was a member of the Demonstration Team.

After leaving Oxford, Butterworth began a career in music, writing criticism for The Times, composing, and teaching at Radley College, Oxfordshire. He also briefly studied piano and organ at the Royal College of Music, where he worked with Hubert Parry among others. However, the academic life was not for him and he stayed less than a year.

Vaughan Williams and Butterworth became close friends. It was Butterworth who suggested to Vaughan Williams that he turn a symphonic poem he was working on into his London Symphony. Vaughan Williams recalled:

We were talking together one day when he said in his gruff, abrupt manner: 'You know, you ought to write a symphony'. I answered...that I’d never written a symphony and never intended to...I suppose Butterworth’s words stung me and, anyhow, I looked out some sketches I had made for...a symphonic poem about London and decided to throw it into symphonic form...From that moment, the idea of a symphony dominated my mind. I showed the sketches to George bit by bit as they were finished, and it was then that I realised that he possessed in common with very few composers a wonderful power of criticism of other men’s work and insight into their ideas and motives. I can never feel too grateful to him for all he did for me over this work and his help did not stop short at criticism.

When the manuscript for that piece was lost, having been sent to Germany, either to the conductor Fritz Busch or for engraving, just before the outbreak of the war, Butterworth, together with Geoffrey Toye and the critic Edward J. Dent, helped Vaughan Williams reconstruct the work. Vaughan Williams dedicated the piece to Butterworth's memory after his death.

== First World War ==
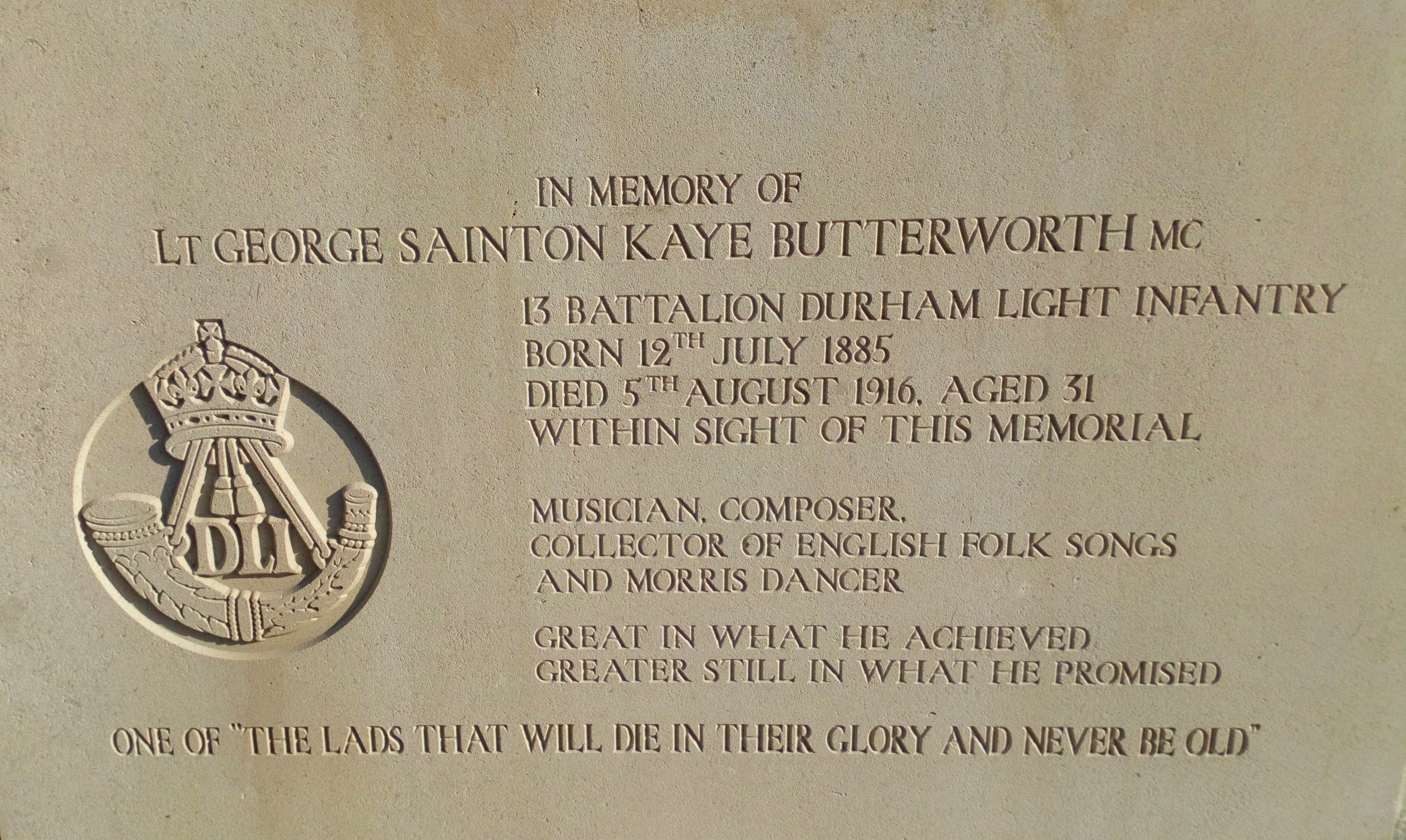
Memorial to George Butterworth at the Pozières Memorial, inscribed: One of "the lads that will die in their glory and never be old"

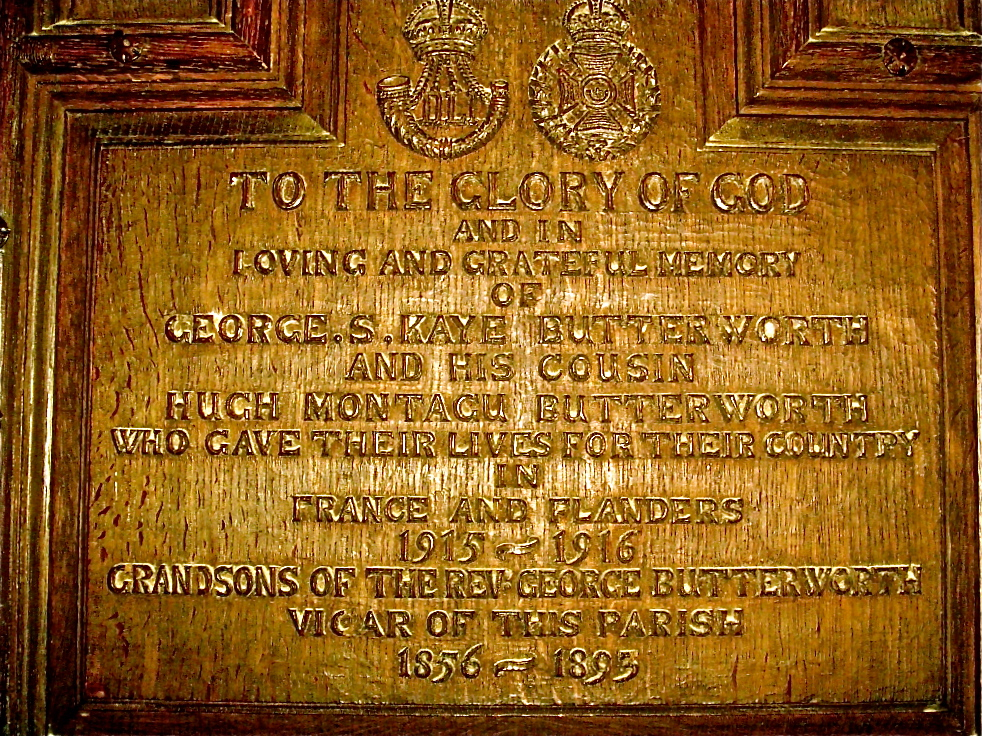
Plaque, Deerhurst Church

At the outbreak of World War I, Butterworth, together with several of his friends, including Geoffrey Toye and R. O. Morris, joined the British Army as a private in the Duke of Cornwall's Light Infantry, but he soon accepted a commission as a subaltern (2nd lieutenant) in the 13th Battalion Durham Light Infantry (DLI), and he was later temporarily promoted to lieutenant. He was known as G. S. Kaye-Butterworth in the Army. Butterworth's letters are full of admiration for the ordinary miners of County Durham who served in his platoon. As part of 23rd Division, the 13th DLI was sent into action to capture the western approaches of the village of Contalmaison on The Somme. Butterworth and his men succeeded in capturing a series of trenches near Pozières on 16–17 July 1916, the traces of which can still be found within a small wood. Butterworth was slightly wounded in the action. For his action, Temporary Lt. George Butterworth, aged 31, was awarded the Military Cross, gazetted 25 August 1916, though he did not live to receive it. The citation for the medal reads as follows:

For conspicuous gallantry in action. After his captain had been wounded, Butterworth commanded his company with great ability and coolness, and with his energy and utter disregard of danger he set a fine example on the front line. His name had previously been brought to notice for good and gallant work.

The Battle of the Somme was then entering its most intense phase. On 4 August, during the Battle of Pozières, 23rd Division was ordered to attack a communications trench, known as Munster Alley, that was in German hands. The soldiers dug an assault trench, naming it "Butterworth Trench" in their officer's honour. In desperate fighting during the night of 4–5 August, and despite suffering friendly fire from Australian artillery, Butterworth and his miners captured and held Munster Alley, albeit with heavy losses. At 04:45 on 5 August, amid frantic German attempts to recapture the position, Butterworth was shot through the head by a sniper. His body was hastily buried by his men in the side of the trench and, following the fierce bombardments of the final two years of conflict, it was never recovered for formal reburial.

When brigade commander, Brigadier General Page Croft, wrote to Butterworth's father to inform him of his son's death, the news that Butterworth had been awarded the Military Cross had not yet reached him. Similarly, the brigadier was astonished to learn that Butterworth had been one of the most promising English composers of his generation. Brigadier Croft wrote that Butterworth was, "A brilliant musician in times of peace, and an equally brilliant soldier in times of stress."

There is confusion about exactly what award(s) Butterworth received, and it has been incorrectly stated that he won the MC twice. That misunderstanding may have arisen because Butterworth's bravery was regularly in evidence during the Somme campaign. He had been mentioned in dispatches early in July, and had been recommended for the MC "for conspicuous gallantry in action" at Bailiff Wood on 9 July. The successful award was "for commanding his company with great ability and coolness" when wounded on 16–17 July. Brigadier Page-Croft mentioned to Butterworth's father that he had "won" the medal again on the night he died. However, the Military Cross was not awarded posthumously at that time, and so Butterworth could never have been awarded it twice.

Although Butterworth's body was never recovered, his unidentified remains may well lie at nearby Pozières Memorial, a Commonwealth War Graves Commission cemetery. His name appears on the Thiepval Memorial. George Butterworth's The Banks of Green Willow has become synonymous for some with the sacrifice of his generation and has been seen by some as an anthem for all "Unknown Soldiers". Sir Alexander Butterworth erected a plaque at St Mary's Priory Church, Deerhurst, Gloucestershire, in memory of his son and of his nephew, Hugh, who died at Loos in 1915. The Rev. George Butterworth, the composer's grandfather, had been vicar of St Mary's in the previous century. In 1918, Sir Alexander also arranged for the printing of a memorial volume in his son's memory. The composer's name is one of the 38 on the war memorial at the Royal College of Music.

Almost all Butterworth's manuscripts were left to Vaughan Williams, after whose death Ursula Vaughan Williams lodged the original works in the Bodleian, Oxford. The folk song collection was donated to the English Folk Dance and Song Society.

== A Shropshire Lad, and other compositions ==
Butterworth did not write a great deal of music and, before and during the war, he destroyed many works he did not care for, in case he did not return and have the chance to revise them. Of those that survive, his works based on A. E. Housman's collection of poems A Shropshire Lad are among the best known. Many English composers of Butterworth's time set Housman's poetry, including Ralph Vaughan Williams.

In 1911 and 1912, Butterworth wrote eleven settings of Housman's poems from A Shropshire Lad. The poems are

1. "Loveliest of Trees"
2. "When I Was One and Twenty"
3. "Look Not in My Eyes"
4. "Think No More, Lad"
5. "The Lads in Their Hundreds"
6. "Is My Team Ploughing"
7. "Bredon Hill"
8. "Oh Fair Enough Are Sky and Plain"
9. "When the Lad for Longing Sighs"
10. "On the Idle Hill of Summer"
11. "With Rue My Heart Is Laden"

He used no known folk tunes in the songs, although "When I Was One and Twenty" was said to be based on a folk tune that has defied identification. The songs were dedicated to Victor Annesley Barrington-Kennett, a friend from Eton and Oxford, who was also to die in France in 1916. They were eventually published in two sets, Six Songs from A Shropshire Lad (1–6 above) and Bredon Hill and Other Songs (7–11), although the composer never settled on a preferred order. Nine of the songs were first performed by James Campbell McInnes (baritone) and Butterworth (piano) on 16 May 1911 at a meeting of the Oxford University Musical Club, organized by Boult. Shortly thereafter Boult sang several of the songs at a private function. At this stage, Butterworth still had not completed "On the idle hill of summer" and did not do so until he was living at Cheyne Gardens in London. It is unusual for the songs to be given publicly in full, although each of the published sets is often performed separately and recorded regularly – in fact, they can be said to be among the most frequently performed English art songs. Six Songs from A Shropshire Lad is the more popular set, with "Is My Team Ploughing?" being the most famous song. Another, "Loveliest of Trees", is the basis for his 1912 orchestral rhapsody, also called A Shropshire Lad, which quotes two songs from the whole – "Loveliest of Trees" and "With Rue My Heart Is Laden".

The parallel is regularly made between the often gloomy and death-obsessed subject matter of A Shropshire Lad, written in the shadow of the Second Boer War, and Butterworth's subsequent death during the Great War. In particular, the song "The lads in their hundreds" tells of young men who leave their homeland to 'die in their glory and never be old'.

The Rhapsody, A Shropshire Lad – a sort of postlude to the songs – employs a normal sized symphony orchestra, and was first performed on 2 October 1913 at the Leeds Festival, conducted by Arthur Nikisch. It was influential upon Vaughan Williams (A Pastoral Symphony), Gerald Finzi (A Severn Rhapsody) and Ernest Moeran (First Rhapsody). Butterworth's other orchestral works are short and based on folksongs he had collected in Sussex in 1907: Two English Idylls (1911) and The Banks of Green Willow (1913). They are often performed and recorded, Banks particularly so. The latter work was premiered by the 24-year-old Adrian Boult on 27 February 1914, at West Kirby, Wirral, (this was in fact Boult's very first professional concert).

Love Blows As the Wind Blows is a setting of poems by W. E. Henley. It exists in three forms: for voice and string quartet, voice and piano and voice and small orchestra. The orchestral version differs from the others quite markedly, not least in having only three songs: "In the Year That's Come and Gone", "Life in Her Creaking Shoes", and "On the Way to Kew" (the other versions include "Fill a Glass with Golden Wine"). The orchestral version was in fact the last music Butterworth worked on before leaving for France, and shows the composer's familiarity with Vaughan Williams' style, as well as with the music of Wagner, Elgar and Debussy.

Butterworth showed real talent that might have flourished but for his early death. The Two English Idylls and The Banks of Green Willow show an ability to handle folk song in a way that eluded many other composers – as the true building blocks of larger forms. His original music (especially the Rhapsody: A Shropshire Lad and the orchestral song cycle Love Blows As The Wind Blows) have a delicacy that brings to mind Debussy or Ibert. However, there is reasonable evidence that he had put composition behind him by the time he went to France, and it is by no means certain that he would have resumed it had he returned. It is certainly likely that he would have faced considerable pressure from friends to compose again, since his orchestral works (particularly the Rhapsody: A Shropshire Lad) had made a great impression, but he was a single-minded man who was unlikely to bow easily to such pressure. He remains perhaps the most obvious case of "what if...?" that is left to us from the battlefields of northern France, and he joins the Frenchman Albéric Magnard, the Spaniard Enrique Granados, and the German Rudi Stephan as possibly the greatest losses to music from the First World War. The great conductor Carlos Kleiber saw in Butterworth a special gift. In his 1978 appearance with the Chicago Symphony Orchestra he programmed, to the surprise of many, Butterworth's English Idyll No. 1.

== List of compositions ==
Butterworth's complete extant works are:

- Two English Idylls for orchestra (1910–1911)
- A Shropshire Lad, Rhapsody for orchestra (1911)
- The Banks of Green Willow for orchestra (1913)
- Love Blows As the Wind Blows, a song cycle for voice and piano (or string quartet) (both 1911–12) or small orchestra (1914) [words William Ernest Henley]
- Suite for String Quartet (1910)
- Eleven Songs from A Shropshire Lad (i.e., Six Songs from A Shropshire Lad, and Bredon Hill and Other Songs) (1910–1911) [words A. E. Housman]
- Folk Songs From Sussex (1912)
- Haste On, My Joys!, song (date unknown, probably pre-1906) [words Robert Bridges]
- I Will Make You Brooches (date unknown) [words Robert Louis Stevenson]
- I Fear Thy Kisses (1909) [words Percy Bysshe Shelley]
- Requiescat, song (1911) [words Oscar Wilde]
- In The Highlands, for female voices and piano (poss. 1912) [words Robert Louis Stevenson]
- On Christmas Night, for SATB chorus a cappella (1912)
- We Get Up in the Morn, for male chorus (poss. 1912) [folksong]
- Morris Dance Tunes Books 8 & 9 (1914)

=== Arrangements of Butterworth's compositions ===
- Fantasia for Orchestra (1914), edited and completed by Martin Yates
- Fantasia for Orchestra (1914), edited and completed by Kriss Russman
- Two English Idylls (arranged for piano duet by John Mitchell) (1999)
- A Shropshire Lad: Rhapsody (arranged for piano by John Mitchell) (2011)
- A Shropshire Lad: Rhapsody (transcribed for concert band or wind ensemble by Don Patterson) (2020)
- Suite for Small Orchestra (arrangement of the Suite for String Quartet by Phillip Brookes) (2012)
- Suite for String Quartette (arranged for String Orchestra by Kriss Russman) (2015)
- Eleven Songs from A Shropshire Lad (with accompaniment for small orchestra, arranged by Phillip Brookes) (2006)
- Six Songs from A Shropshire Lad (with accompaniment for orchestra by Kriss Russman) (2015)

== Other writings ==
The Country Dance Book, parts 3 (1912) and 4 (1916) with Cecil Sharp

== Recordings ==
All three orchestral works (Two English Idylls, A Shropshire Lad: Rhapsody. and The Banks of Green Willow)
Boult/LPO (rec. 1973); Lyrita SRCD 245
Marriner/ASMF (rec. 1976); Decca 468 802-2
Boughton/English String Orchestra (rec. 1986); Nimbus NI 5068
Llewellyn/RLPO (rec. 1991); Decca 436 401-2
Elder/Hallé Orchestra (rec. 2002); Hallé CD HLL 7503
Russman/BBC National Orchestra of Wales (rec. 2015); BIS Records BIS-2195

Two English Idylls only
Boult/British Symphony Orch. (No. 1 only, rec. 1922); His Master's Voice Cc1129
Dilkes/English Sinfonia (rec. 1971); His Master's Voice ESD 7101
Carlos Kleiber/Chicago SO (No. 1 only, rec. 2 June 1983); Memories CD
Tate/English Chamber Orchestra (rec. 1987); EMI CDC7 47945-2
Horvay/Prague Radio SO (No. 2 only, date unknown); Artist’s Rifles CD41
Wilson/Royal Liverpool PO (rec. 2011) Avie

A Shropshire Lad: Rhapsody only
Boult/British Symphony Orch. (rec. 1920); His Master's Voice 4618AF
Boult/Hallé Orchestra (rec. 1942); VAI Audio VAIA 1067-2
Stokowski/NBC SO (rec. 1944); Cala CACD 0528
Goossens/Sydney SO (rec 1952); His Master's Voice DB 9792-3
Boult/LPO (rec. 1954); Belart CD 461354-2
Barbirolli/ Hallé Orchestra (rec. 1956); Barbirolli Society SJB 1022
Barbirolli/ Hallé Orchestra; EMI 4577672
Dilkes/English Sinfonia (rec. 1971); His Master's Voice CSD 3696
Elder/Halle Orchestra (rec. 2002); BBC MM 289

The Banks of Green Willow
See the separate page

Fantasia for Orchestra (completed by Kriss Russman)

Russman/BBC National Orchestra of Wales (rec.2015) BIS Records BIS 2195
Songs (complete)
The Complete Butterworth Songbook: Stone/Barlow; Stone Records 5060192780024 (All Butterworth’s songs, including the voice/piano version of Love Blows. It also includes a short silent film of Butterworth morris dancing. The tracks from this disc are included among the details below.)

All eleven Shropshire Lad songs ('Six Songs' and 'Bredon Hill and Other Songs')
Cameron/Moore; Dutton
Luxon/Willison (rec. 1976); Decca 468 802-2
Luxon/Willison (rec. 1990); Chandos CHAN 8831
Williams/Burnside; Naxos 8.572426
Rolfe-Johnson/Johnson; Hyperion CDD22044
Terfel/Martineau(rec. 1995); DG 445946
Allen/Parsons (rec. 2001) EMI 67428
Maltman/Vignoles; Hyperion CDA 67378
Stone/Barlow; Stone Records 5060192780024
Keenlyside/Martineau; Sony Classical 88697 94424-2
Rutherford/Asti (rec. 2012); BIS SACD 1610

Six Songs from A Shropshire Lad only
Henderson/Moore (rec. 1941); Dutton CDLX 7038
Shirley-Quirk/Isepp (rec. 1966); Saga STXID5260
Rayner Cook/Benson; Unicorn
Gehrman/Farmer; Nimbus NI 5033
Rolfe-Johnson/Willinson; EMI
Lemalu/Burnside (rec. 2003); BBC MM298
Allen/Martineau; Wigmore Hall Live WHLIVE0002
Polegato/Burnside CBC Records
Trew/Vignoles; Meridian CDE84185
Varcoe/Hickox/City of London Sinfonia (orch. Lance Baker) (rec. 1989); Chandos CHAN 8743

I will Make You Brooches
Williams/Burnside; Naxos 8.572426
Stone/Barlow; Stone Records 5060192780024

I Fear Thy Kisses
Williams/Burnside; Naxos 8.572426
Stone/Barlow; Stone Records 5060192780024

Requiescat
Varcoe/Benson; Hyperion CDA 6621/2
Williams/Burnside; Naxos 8.572426
Stone/Barlow; Stone Records 5060192780024

Love Blows as the Wind Blows

(Voice and piano)
Stone/Barlow; Stone Records 5060192780024

(Voice and string quartet)
Oxenham/Bingham String Quartet; Meridian DUOCD 89026
Lemalu/Belcea Quartet (rec. 2005); EMI 5 58050

(Voice and orchestra)
Rutherford/Russman/BBC NOW (rec.2015) BIS Records BIS 2195
Tear/Handley/CBSO; EMI CDM7 64731-2
Varcoe/Hickox/City of London Sinfonia (rec. 1989); Chandos CHAN 8743

Folk Songs from Sussex
Williams/Burnside; Naxos 8.572426
Stone/Barlow; Stone Records 5060192780024

Folk songs collected by Butterworth
Triple Echo by Coope, Boyes and Simpson contains songs from the Butterworth collection. The Banks of Green Willow, The Cuckoo and The Turtle Dove are given with all verses. There are also songs collected by Vaughan Williams and Grainger. (Rec 2005); No Masters NMCD22

== Roads ==
Three roads are named after Butterworth:

- Butterworth Road, Trichirappali, Tamil Nadu, India (10.830471°N 78.69789°E).
- Butterworth Close in Newport, south Wales (51.59082°N 2.934842°W), one of several named after composers.
- Chemin George Butterworth (George Butterworth Lane; 50.041172°N 2.733112°E), at Pozières on the Somme battlefield.

== Bibliography ==
- George Butterworth Memorial Volume, privately printed, 1918
- Copley, Ian (1985). George Butterworth and his Music : a centennial tribute. London: Thames Publishing. ISBN 9780905210292.
- Barlow, Michael (1997). Whom the Gods Love : the Life and Music of George Butterworth (1. publ. ed.). London: Toccata Press. ISBN 9780907689423.
- Barlow, Michael and Brookes, Phillip: Prefaces to 3 volumes of the works of George Butterworth, Musikproduktion Jürgen Höflich, Munich, 2006 and 2007
- Murphy, Anthony: Banks of Green Willow: The Life and Times of George Butterworth, Cappella Archive, Malvern, 2012. 2nd revised and updated edition, 2015. ISBN 9781902918624

== See also ==
- Charles James Mott – "Elgar's Baritone" (died of wounds in 1918)
- Ivor Gurney
