= Graham Peel =

English composer (1877–1937)

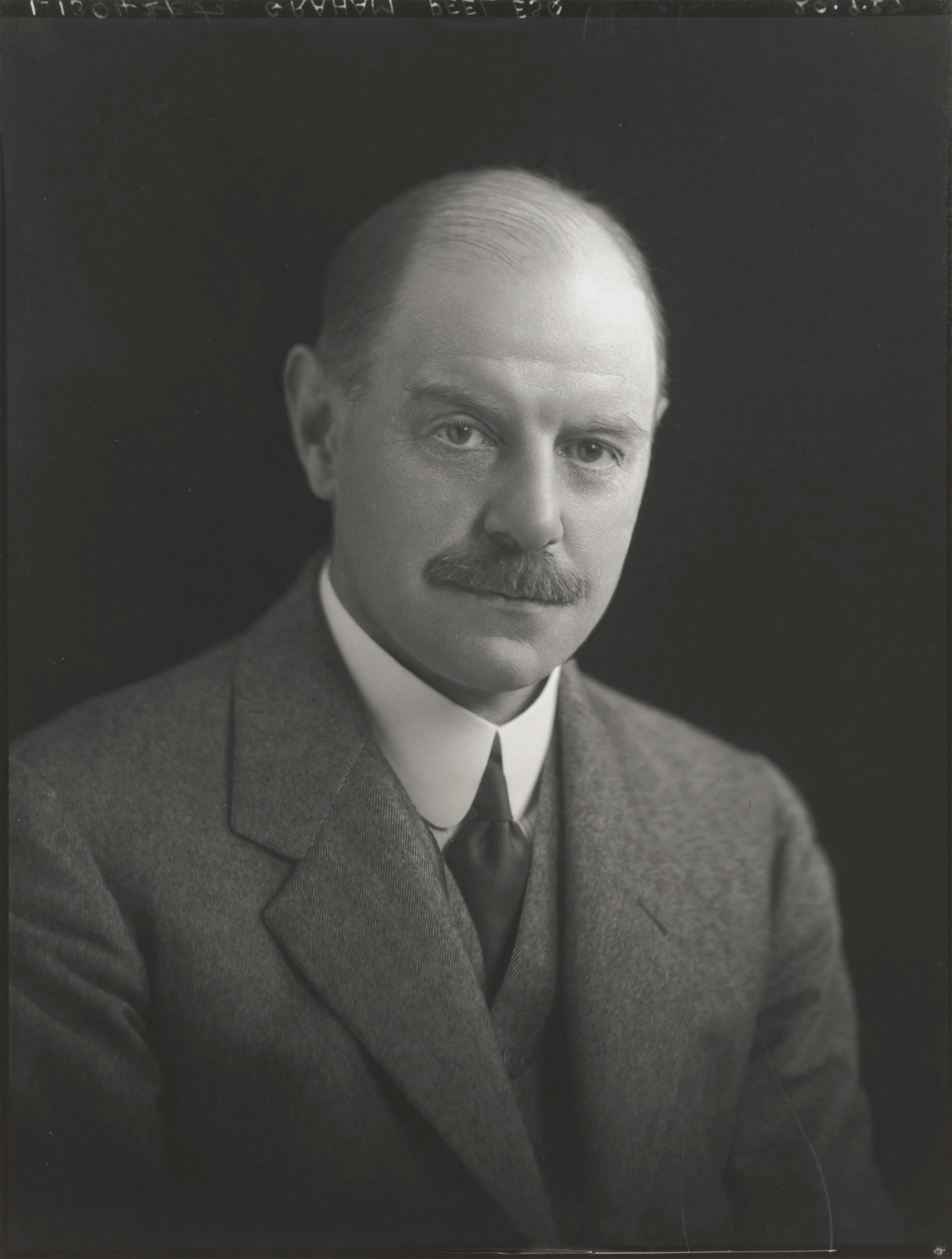
- Peel in 1927
- Born: Gerald Graham Peel; 9 August 1877
- Died: 16 October 1937 (aged 60)
- Occupation: Composer

Gerald Graham Peel (9 August 1877 – 16 October 1937) was an English composer.

== Life ==
Graham Peel's father was Gerald Peel, a millionaire Lancashire cotton spinner and magistrate of Pendlebury, near Manchester, England.

During his life, Peel was one of the first persons 'to take parties inside prisons to entertain the inmates', and of unobtrusive character, was later remembered for his generosity. Clothes and jobs for prisoners were provided through Peel with his involvement in the Dorset and Bournemouth Discharged Prisoners' Aid Society.

He was a resident of 'Marden Ash', Bournemouth on his death, after a year's illness. A philanthropist, he died leaving £191,499.

== Compositions ==
Peel wrote more than 100 songs, many of them settings of A. E. Housman. Many settings were for folk songs and pianoforte solos, and performed as far abroad as Australia. His tunes included:

Almond, wild almond
Go down to Kew in lilac time
Her loveliness
In summer time on Bredon (well regarded, and written c. 1908)
Loveliest of trees
Oh like a Queen
Spring waters
The early morning
The lute-player
The wild swan

The 1920 tune 'The challenge' was composed by Peel to the words of the poem of the same name by Scottish-Australian poet and bush balladeer Will H. Ogilvie (1869–1963).
