= Underwoods =

1887 collection of poems by Robert Louis Stevenson

Underwoods is a collection of poems by Robert Louis Stevenson published in 1887. It comprises two books, Book I with 38 poems in English, Book II with 16 poems in Scots. He says in the initial note that "I am from the Lothians myself; it is there I heard the language spoken about my childhood; and it is in the drawling Lothian voice that I repeat it to myself."

The dedication is to "a few out of many doctors who have brought me comfort and help." He starts by saying that "There are men and classes of men that stand above the common herd: the soldier, the sailor and the shepherd not infrequently; the artist rarely; rarer still the clergyman; the physician almost as a rule. He is the flower (such as it is) of our civilization ...."

Stevenson mainly relies on English spelling, but touches on Scottish spelling, pridefully creating a "fresh stumbling-block for English readers"
