= James Campbell McInnes =

English singer and teacher (1874–1945)

- Born: 23 January 1874
- Origin: Ramsbottom, Lancashire, United Kingdom
- Died: 8 February 1945 (age 71)
- Genre: Classical
- Occupations: Singer, teacher
- Instrument: Singing
- Years active: 1899 to 1945

James Campbell McInnes (23 January 1874 – 8 February 1945) was a well-known English baritone singer and teacher at the turn of the 20th century, ex-husband of author Angela Thirkell and father of writer Colin MacInnes.

== Early life ==
He was born to parents Archibald McInnes and Mary Gallagher on 23 January 1874, in Ramsbottom, Lancashire.

== Career ==
James Campbell McInnes, a baritone, studied at the Royal College of Music (R.C.M.) under a succession of great teachers including George Henschel, Sir Charles Santley, William Shakespeare, Jacques Bouhy, and Jean de Reszke. He was a composer of songs and, in the early days of the folk-song movement, he collected songs in Scotland. He worked with Lucy Broadwood and Cecil Sharp and sang at the dedication ceremony at the opening of Cecil Sharp House.

He gave after-dinner recitals for affluent Edwardian families at their homes as a result of his close friendship with Lucy Broadwood and regularly appeared in concerts across England, including Leeds and Worcester and the Broadwood Concerts.

He was closely associated with the English composer Ralph Vaughan Williams and premiered many of his vocal works including the songs "Blackmwore by the Stour" and "Whither must I wander?" in 1902. The latter was the first song of the cycle Songs of Travel to be written. McInnes also sang the baritone solos in the world premieres of Willow-Wood (1903), A Sea Symphony (1910), and Five Mystical Songs (1911). The early song "Boy Johnny," based on a Christina Rossetti poem, was first published in The Vocalist 1/6 September 1902 with the dedication "To J. Campbell McInnes, Esq." Of his singing the composer has written, "The two outstanding characteristics of Campbell McInnes's singing (in addition to his beautiful baritone voice) were his feeling for words and his almost unique sense of the shape of a tune. My most vivid recollections of his singing are connected with that lovely melody (often attributed not surprisingly to J. S. Bach) " Jesu meines Glaubens Zier " and the words of Christ in the Gospel according to St. Matthew. It is for these two qualities that the guardians of English folk-song should keep his name in grateful remembrance."

He also worked with the composer Samuel Coleridge-Taylor and sang his "Death of Minnehaha" from Hiawatha at Mary Wakefield's former festival in the Lake District in 1901. McInnes sang the 1911 premiere of nine of George Butterworth's settings of poems by A. E. Housman, with the composer at the piano. With the addition of two more songs, these became the song cycles Six Songs from A Shropshire Lad and Bredon Hill and Other Songs.

In 1919, he moved to Toronto in Canada, where he taught elocution and singing, and continued his concert career. His work aided in the development of music in Toronto; an example of which were his "Tuesday Nine O'Clocks", a series of recitals with unfamiliar renditions of little known vocal and chamber music. During the late 1920s he was on staff as a diction coach with the American Opera Company. He also taught at the University of Toronto until his death in 1945.

== Sexuality ==
McInnes is rumoured to have had close male friendships prior to marrying Angela Mackail (later to become the author Angela Thirkell). He was known for his heavy drinking at the time of his marriage, and much later on his bisexuality became known.

== Personal life ==
McInnes and Angela Mackail had two sons, Graham McInnes (1912–1970) and Colin MacInnes (1914–1976), both of whom became well-known authors. They also had a third child, Mary, who lived less than 18 months. During their marriage, he was unfaithful by a dalliance with one of the servants. This infidelity led to their divorce in 1917. Angela left with her two sons and married George Thirkell, a Captain in the ANZAC forces. They had one child named Lancelot George ("Lance"). In 1919, they settled in Melbourne, Australia. However, in 1930, Angela left George Thirkell and returned to England with Lance, where she wrote many books and became a well-known author until her death in 1960.

Neither Colin nor Graham McInnes had any contact with their father when they were growing up. However, in 1934, Graham began a search for him and travelled along with Colin to meet him in Canada. Graham described this in a book, published in 1967 called "Finding A Father", where he writes of the search for his father. James Campbell McInnes was apparently delighted to hear from his sons, although it came as a huge surprise. Graham moved to Canada soon after their meeting.

== Death ==
McInnes died some years after their meeting in 1945. He is buried in Bala, Ontario, the hometown of his Canadian partner from the Jackson family.

== In literature ==
McInnes is referenced in Ken Follet's novel Fall of Giants (Part One, Ch. 9 iv). He is shown singing selections from Handel to a London audience in July 1914, on the verge of the outbreak of the First World War. Some in his audience, worried about the prospect of an imminent war with Germany, reflect that Handel was a German composer who spent most of his life in London.
