= When I Was One-and-Twenty =

1896 poem by A. E. Housman

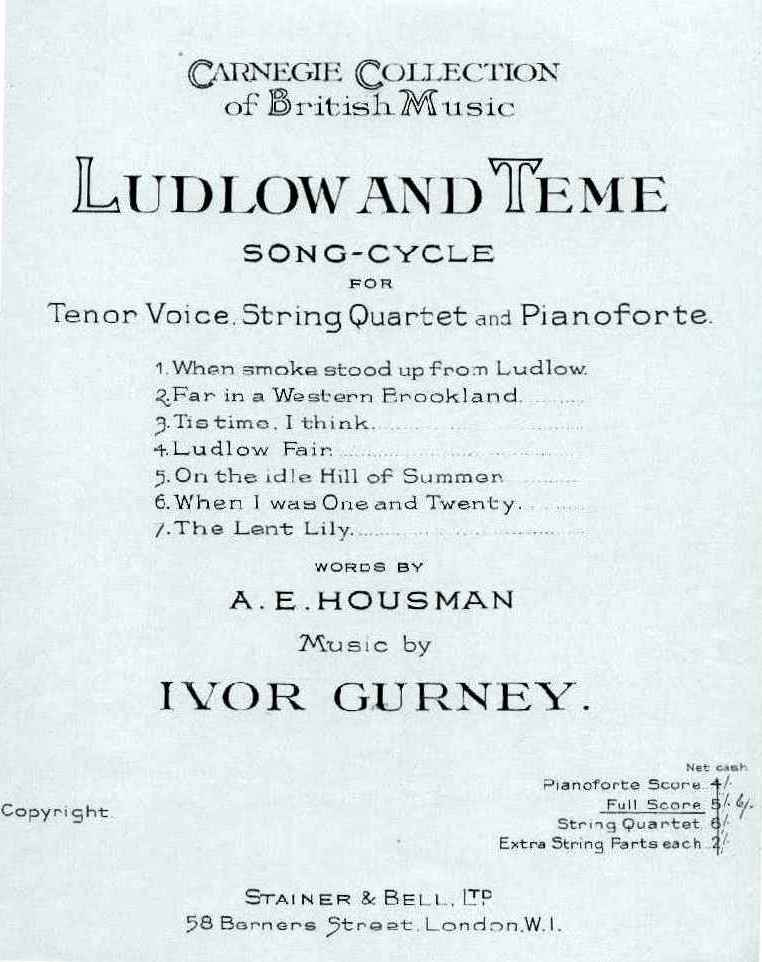
Ivor Gurney's Ludlow and Teme, the version for tenor voice, piano and string quartet (1923)

When I Was One-and-Twenty is the first line of the untitled Poem XIII from A. E. Housman’s A Shropshire Lad (1896), but has often been anthologised and given musical settings under that title. The piece is simply worded but contains references to the now superseded coins guineas and crowns. It is the monologue of a young man of twenty-two who reflects on the truth of the advice given him a year before not to give his heart away in love. Writing to his publisher in December, 1920, Housman scornfully observed of an illustrated edition of the poem, “How like an artist to think that the speaker is a woman!” A heterosexual male reading could still be given the lament then because, at the time, Housman's homosexuality was unsuspected. Later the possibility that the poem refers to Housman's unrequited love for a fellow male student at university has been suggested.

== Musical settings ==
Housman’s poem was among the first to be set by composers, beginning with Arthur Somervell’s as part of his Songcycle from A Shropshire Lad and the single setting by Stephen Adams, both in 1904. Two frequently performed versions are George Butterworth’s, from his Six Songs from A Shropshire Lad for medium high voice and piano (1911), and Ivor Gurney’s from Ludlow and Teme (1919). The style of setting varies from the simplicity of the traditional tune fitted to it by Butterworth to the “chromatically overwrought” music of Arnold Bax. As of 2025, some 44 versions are currently listed on The LiederNet Archive but they do not include arrangements for choir such as those by Richard Nance as part of Songs of a Young Man (1985) and Robert Rhein in Three Songs from A Shropshire Lad. There have also been popular versions, as in the solo performance by Michael Nesmith and the group performance by the German folk group, Black Eye.
