= Bredon Hill and Other Songs =

Song cycle composed by George Butterworth in 1912

Bredon Hill and Other Songs is a song cycle for baritone and piano composed by George Butterworth (1885–1916) in 1912. It sets five poems from A. E. Housman's 1896 collection A Shropshire Lad.

Butterworth set another six poems from A Shropshire Lad in Six Songs from A Shropshire Lad (1911). Nine of the eleven songs were premiered at Oxford on 16 May 1911, by James Campbell McInnes (baritone) and the composer (piano).

A performance typically takes 15 minutes. The songs are as follows, with Roman numerals from A Shropshire Lad:

1. XXI "Bredon Hill"
2. XX "Oh Fair Enough Are Sky and Plain"
3. VI "When the Lad for Longing Sighs"
4. XXXV "On the Idle Hill of Summer"
5. LIV "With Rue My Heart Is Laden"
