= C. W. Orr =

English composer (1893–1976)

Charles Wilfred Leslie Orr, generally known as C. W. Orr (31 July 1893 – 24 February 1976), was an English composer. He is particularly noted for his songs, though his output was small. He wrote only 35 songs in 82 years, 24 of them setting words by A. E. Housman.

== Biography ==
Born in Cheltenham, Gloucestershire, shortly after the death from tuberculosis of his father (who was a captain in the Indian Army), he learnt the piano and studied music theory as a child. He was attracted to the singing of Elena Gerhardt, whom he heard sing in London and developed an interest in lieder, especially those of Johannes Brahms, Franz Schubert and Robert Schumann. After reading Ernest Newman's book on the composer Hugo Wolf he determined to become a songwriter, which occupation he pursued through study at the Guildhall School of Music with Orlando Morgan. He was attracted to the music of Frederick Delius after approaching him at a London restaurant in 1915 and Delius became his mentor, helping him with his early compositions. He also came to know Philip Heseltine (Peter Warlock), who helped him in publishing his early songs.

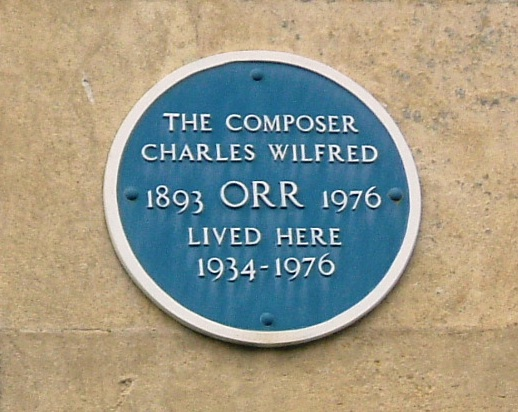
Plaque commemorating the home of Orr on St. Mary's Street, Painswick

He married in 1929 and moved to Painswick, Gloucestershire, to get away from the busy atmosphere of London, which was detrimental to his health; a vaccination as a child had left him with eczema, and he contracted tuberculosis as an adult. He would remain in Painswick for the rest of his life. His work as a composer was dominated by the composition of songs accompanied by piano; his life's study was the expressive setting of poetry to music. He was a particular admirer of A. E. Housman, and wrote more settings of his poetry than any other composer. He became acquainted with Housman's poetry just after World War I, during which he had enlisted, but was unable to fight for medical reasons. He undertook research visits to Shropshire, taking photographs, and attended one of Housman's lectures as Kennedy Professor of Latin at Cambridge University. He asked for permission to translate A Shropshire Lad into German so he could bring his songs into wider circulation, but the request was refused.

His piano accompaniments and postludes are an integral part of each song, providing more than bare harmony; examples of its use for programme music include fluttering semiquavers depicting aspen leaves in Along the Field and heavy chords in a march to the scaffold in The Carpenter's Son. His harmonic language is a mixture of English modality and late Romanticism.

== Works ==
His music is published by Chester Novello and Oxford University Press.

=== Songs ===
For solo voice and piano.

- Plucking the Rushes (1921)
- Silent Noon (1921)
- The Earl of Bristol's Farewell (1927)
- Tryste Noel (1927)
- When as I Wake (1928)
- Hymn before Sleep (1953)
- While Summer on is Stealing (1953)
- 4 Songs (1959): Bahnhofstrasse (1932), Requiem (1954), The Time of Roses (1955), Since Thou, O Fondest and Truest (1957)

==== Housman settings ====
- When the Lad for Longing Sighs (1921)
- 2 Songs from A Shropshire Lad: 'Tis Time I Think by Wenlock Town, Loveliest of Trees, The Cherry (1921–1922)
- The Carpenter's Son (1922)
- When I was One-and-Twenty (1924)
- With rue my heart is laden (1924)
- Is my team ploughing (1925)
- On your Midnight Pallet Lying (1925)
- O When I Was in Love with You (1926)
- This Time of Year (1926)
- Soldier from the Wars Returning (1928)
- 7 Songs from A Shropshire Lad (1934): Along the Field (1927), When I Watch the Living Meet (1930), The Lent Lily, Farewell to barn and stack and tree (1928), O fair enough are sky and plain (1931), Hughley Steeple (1930), When Smoke Stood Up from Ludlow (1929)
- The Lads in their Hundreds (1936)
- 3 Songs from A Shropshire Lad (1940): Into My Heart an Air that Kills (1935), Westward on the High-Hilled Plains (1927), O see how thick the goldcup flowers, (1939)
- The Isle of Portland (1938)
- In Valleys Green and Still (1952)

=== Choral music ===
- The Brewer's Man, bass and two-part choir (1927)
- Slumber Song, choir and piano (1937)
- Fain would I change that note, three-part choir and piano (1937)

=== Instrumental music ===
- Cotswold Hill-Tune, string orchestra, (1937)
- Midsummer Dance, cello and piano (1957)

== Recordings ==
=== Songs (complete) ===
- The complete CW Orr songbook – volume 1; Stone Records
- The complete CW Orr songbook – volume 2; Stone Records

=== Songs (extracts) ===
- A. E. Housman: A Shropshire Lad, Complete in verse and song; Hyperion Records CDA66471/2

== Sources ==
- Jane Wilson: 'Orr, C(harles) W(ilfred)', Grove Music Online ed. L. Macy (Accessed 2007-06-07), http://www.grovemusic.com/
- Andrew Green: notes to A. E. Housman: A Shropshire Lad, Complete in verse and song; Hyperion Records CDA66471/2
