= Nick Peros =

Canadian classical composer (born 1963)

Nick Peros (born March 17, 1963) is a Canadian classical composer. He bases his musical work on symphonic, orchestral, choral, vocal, and chamber genres and is also a published author.

He was born in Toronto, Ontario.

== Compositions and recordings ==
Peros' catalogue of works includes compositions for a cappella chorus, accompanied solo voice, solo instrumental works, as well as chamber and orchestral works.

=== Vocal ===
Peros's vocal works are primarily songs for solo voice and piano and are settings of various poetic texts, including texts by Emily Brontë, William Blake, Emily Dickinson, A.E. Housman, William Wordsworth, Robert Louis Stevenson, et al. His CD Songs (Phoenix Records, 2000), performed by soprano Heidi Klann and pianist Alayne Hall, features thirty-one songs for voice and piano, seventeen of which are settings of the poetry of Brontë, with a number of those being the first time her poems have been set to music.

=== Choral ===
Peros's choral works focus largely on a cappella motets, composed for two to five part choruses and characterized by both homophonic and polyphonic textures. Peros' debut CD Motets (Phoenix Records 1999), features a selection of 20 motets performed by The Renaissance Singers, conducted by Richard Cunningham. The Motets received their world premiere performance on September 24, 1999, at Toronto's George Weston Recital Hall. It was performed by The Renaissance Singers, conducted by Richard Cunningham.

Prayer of Consolation is a large-scale a cappella choral work in eleven movements composed to mark the First Anniversary of 9/11, featuring a Biblical text compiled by Peros to reflect a dialogue between God and Man on the day of those events. It received its world premiere on September 10, 2002, in Washington, D.C., at the Washington National Cathedral, where it was performed by the Palestrina Choir, conducted by Michael Harrison, as part of the U.S. commemorations of the first anniversary of 9/11.

=== Solo instrumental ===
Peros's compositions for solo instrument include works for flute, cello, harp, piano, and guitar. Soliloquies (Phoenix Records, 2012) features a selection of works for solo instrument, including Eden for solo flute, Suite No.1 for Solo Cello and five Poemes for Solo Piano. Selected Poemes for Solo Piano were recorded by Canadian pianist Linda Shumas and were included on her recording "Paradise Reborn".

Compositions for solo guitar include 24 Nocturnes for Solo Guitar, Sonata for Solo Guitar, Rondo for Solo Guitar and five Suites for Solo Guitar. Nocturnes: 24 Nocturnes for Solo Guitar (DeoSonic Music, 2017) was the world premiere recording of the 24 nocturnes and was performed and recorded by Canadian guitarist Michael Kolk. The 24 Nocturnes and the Rondo for Solo Guitar are published by Les Productions D'Oz.

=== Chamber and orchestral ===
Peros's chamber works include a Sonata for Cello and Piano, various duets and music for string trio. His orchestral works include Prelude to Beren & Luthien, a one-movement work for full orchestra inspired by the Tolkien story, and Northern Lights. Northern Lights (1993) is a one-movement orchestral work which received its world premiere in November 1994, performed by Symphony Hamilton, conducted by Clyde Mitchell. In 1997, Northern Lights was further performed across Canada, including a performance by the Regina Symphony Orchestra, conducted by Marc David, which was recorded and broadcast nationally by CBC Radio. Most recently, Northern Lights, was performed by the Arcady Ensemble under the direction of Ronald Beckett.

== Producer ==
Peros is also a music producer. His CD O Canada – A Canadian Celebration (Peros Music, 2002) is both Certified platinum and Certified gold, while the CDs Home for Christmas (Peros Music, 2004), HomeGrown (Peros Music, 2005) and Stories from Home (Peros Music, 2005) are Certified gold.
