= Newcastle Scholarship =

Annual prize at Eton College, England

The Newcastle Scholarship is an annual prize awarded at Eton College in England for the highest performance in a series of special written examinations taken over the course of a week. It was instituted and first awarded in 1829 and is the college's most prestigious prize. Originally focused on both Divinity and Classics (which is now examined separately), the main prize now covers philosophical theology, moral theory, and applied ethics.

== History ==
The scholarship was instituted and first awarded in 1829 on the initiative and benefaction of Henry Pelham-Clinton, 4th Duke of Newcastle. The Statutes, recorded in 1841, state:

'The design and object of these Scholarships is to promote and encourage a Religious education and sound and useful Learning in general among the Scholars of Eton School, including particularly accurate Scholarship in Greek and Roman literature but most especially and principally to inculcate a thorough knowledge of the Evidence, Doctrines and Precepts of the Christian Religion.'

The winner of the Newcastle Scholarship was awarded a cash prize of £250, a considerable sum in 1829, while the runner-up received a gold medal. Originally a series of up to twelve examinations in the ancient languages and in knowledge of Biblical texts, the Scholarship was split into two in 1977, becoming one Prize for Divinity and one for Classics.

== Exam format ==
Since 1987 the Newcastle Scholarship has been an examination in philosophical theology, moral theory, and applied ethics. Candidates sit two three-hour papers after Long Leave (the mid-term break) in the Lent Half (the winter term). Each paper consists of about 12 questions divided into two sections. Candidates must answer three questions in each paper, at least one chosen from each section.

Since its foundation, many distinguished British theologians and philosophers have been invited to examine the Newcastle. In 1840 William Gladstone was one of the examiners, together with Lord Lyttelton. In addition to setting the papers and marking the scripts, they choose a set book on a theme of their choice, upon which candidates are examined.

== Winners ==
Distinguished winners of the Newcastle Scholarship have included Sir Edward Shepherd Creasy (1831), William Johnson Cory (1841), William Ralph Inge (1879), M. R. James (1882), Patrick Shaw-Stewart (1905), Arthur Rhys-Davids (1916), Quintin Hogg, Baron Hailsham of St Marylebone (1925), Douglas Hurd (1947), William Waldegrave (1965, previously Provost of Eton College) and Kwasi Kwarteng (1992). Those who have become professional classicists include Roger Mynors (1922), Charles Willink (1946), Adrian Hollis (1958), Richard Jenkyns (1966) and Armand D’Angour (1976).

The following is a list of winning Scholars, and Medallists (runners-up) since 1946. They are listed with their post-nominals earned at the school: "KS": King's Scholar; "OS": Oppidan Scholar; "MS": Music Scholar; "ME": Music Exhibitioner.

"ma" indicates the elder of two brothers at the school, or exceptionally the eldest of three or the second of four or more; "mi" similarly indicates the second of two or three, or the third of four or more.

Year	Scholar	Medallist
1946	C. W. Willink, KS	T. J. Burrows, KS
1947	D. R. Hurd, KS	S. Goldblatt, KS
1948	C. L. Drage, OS	S. M. Haskell, KS
1949	S. M. Haskell, KS	S. H. Willink, KS
1950	S. H. Willink, KS	M. C. Stokes, KS
1951	S. L. Egerton, KS	M. C. Stokes, KS
1952	M. Mortimer, KS	W. J. A. Wickham, OS
1953	S. L. Hugh-Jones, KS	R. C. Palmer, KS
1954	R. B. O’G. Anderson ma KS	P. M. O. Stafford, KS
1955	N. P. Bayne, KS	C. M. K. Taylor ma KS
1956	E. L. Hussey, KS	P. T. S. Carson, KS
1957	M. Elliott, KS	A. S. Hollis, KS
1958	A. S. Hollis, KS	T. R. Adès, KS
1959	T. R. Adès, KS	J. P. Steele, KS
1960	K. A. O. Fulton, KS	G. A. D. Emerson, KS
1961	G. A. D. Emerson, KS	J. V. Kerby, KS
1962	R. J. A. Carnwath ma OS	P. T. Hutchinson, KS
1963	F. M. Prideaux, KS	R. J. Lane Fox, OS
1964	A. G. Foster-Carter, KS	R. J. Lane Fox, OS
1965	W. A. Waldegrave, OS	A. J. L. Bruce, OS
1966	R. H. A. Jenkyns, KS	N. S. R. Hornblower, KS
1967	J. W. Waterfield, KS	N. S. R. Hornblower, KS
1968	P. C. H. Snow, KS	O. W. A. Barnes, KS
1969	S. P. M. Mackenzie, KS	M. P. R. Wormald, KS
1970	R. R. Oliver, OS	A. D. A. Macdonald, OS
1971	A. W. R. Morrison, KS	A. J. Pemberton, KS
1972	A. J. Pemberton, KS	J. D. Leigh Pemberton ma OS
1973	H. C. Lawson-Tancred, KS	S. G. Barber, OS
1974	M. J. Lyall Grant, OS	J. H. Leigh Pemberton ma OS
1975	H. C. Eyres, KS	G. S. Monck OS
1976	A. J. D’Angour ma KS	M. A. Anderson KS
1977	A. A. J. Monson ma OS	N. I. Macpherson, KS
1978	D. W. K. Anderson, KS	M.R.V. Southern KS
1979	J. W. Mackinnon, KS	J. W. R Cummings, KS
1980	P. D. P. Barnes ma OS	M. Brandreth, KS
1981	K. K. Nath, KS	G. T. S. Davson, KS
1982	G. T. S. Davson KS	A. D. T. Cromartie, KS
1983	H. J. B. Smith, KS	A. D. T. Cromartie KS
1984	D. W. Runciman, OS	J. F. Boff, KS
1985	S. H. Mandelbrote, KS	A. J. N. Roxburgh KS
1986	P. S. Drinkall, OS	J. W. Rees-Mogg
1987	B. J. Smith ma OS	W. G. Wringe, KS
1988	H. R. M. Dimbleby	C. R. Heatly, KS MS
1989	J. B. R. Reppas ma KS	T. G. M. Mitcheson, OS
1990	E. W. J. Lamb	N. J. I. Kind, KS
1991	T. P. Elias, KS	D. K. Renton, OS
1992	K. A. A. Kwarteng, KS	F. F-T. Chen, OS
1993	D. A. S. Hugh-Jones, KS	A. C. Warr, OS
1994	I. N. M. Wright, KS	A. C. E. Ruck Keene, OS
1995	T. D. Calvocoressi, OS	R. J. Starling, KS
1996	P. M-T. Sohmen, KS ME	S. Krishnan, KS
1997	R. A. Eliott Lockhart, OS	R. V. Gowan ma KS
1998	N. T. Shah, KS	L. P. C. Geddes
1999	C. P. W. Fielding, OS	N. T. Shah, KS
2000	J. D. J. Neicho, KS	M. J. Pappenheim, KS
2001	H. H. Briance, OS	A. Grenfell ma KS ME
2002	O. J. C. Bridge	H. H. Briance, OS
2003	J. C. Dacre ma K.S	H. J. Ellis, OS
2004	H. C. R. Donati, OS	T. C. Wingfield, OS
2005	H. C. R. Donati, OS	F. J. O. Spring
2006	N. H. J. Gaisman OS ME	A. H. White mi KS
2007	M. I. L. Osman	A. T. P. Parham mi
2008	G. K. Kotecha, KS	J. H. F. Roxburgh, KS
2009	A. A. Nadeem, KS	R. Mehan, OS
2010	A. A. Cornish, KS	D. J. F. C. Leung, KS MS
2011	W. J. Gowers, KS	H. Xu, KS
2012	M. A. P. Seely, KS	H. Xu, KS
2013	H. C. Elliott ma KS	S. A. P. Norman ma OS ME
2014	C. J. Styles	A. A. Groes, OS
2015	B. P. Barnard	W. Baker
2016	J. Choo-Choy	M. Woernle ma OS
2017	L. Fraser-Taliente OS	L. Li KS
2018	K. Power KS	A. F. Warley
2019	G. Conradie KS	P. D. Anderson
2020	F. A. W. Kirkby MS	W. I. S. Ferguson ma
2021	M. K. N. DeLorenzo ma KS	J. Chang, KS MS
2022	M. K. N. DeLorenzo ma KS	R. C. Z. Power OS
2023	A. M. H. McCallum KS	A. R. A. McIntyre OS ME
2024	E. W. H. Brown OS ME	R. P. M. McKee
2025	J. W. Pike ma KS ME	C. J. Gray OS
2026	T. J. P. Zahl OS MS	Z. W. Shield ma OS

== Recent Examiners ==
Year	Examiner	Set Text
1988	Professor John MacQuarrie (Christ Church, Oxford)	Peace Studies: The Hard Questions
1989	Canon Brian Hebblethwaite (Queens’ College. Cambridge)	Mahoney, Bioethics and Belief
1990	Professor Stephen Prickett (Glasgow University)	Prickett, What do the Translators Think They are Up To?
1991	Rabbi Julia Neuberger	Webster, A Brief History of Blasphemy
1992	Stephen Sykes (Bishop of Ely)	Report on Faith in the Countryside
1993	Professor Basil Mitchell (Oxford University)	Sacks, The Persistence of Faith
1994	Sir Anthony Kenny (Rhodes House, Oxford)	Casey, Pagan Virtue
1995	Professor Stephen Clark (Liverpool University)	Regis, Great Mambo Chicken and the Transhuman Condition
1996	Dr Janet Martin Soskice (Jesus College, Cambridge)	Sacks, Faith in the Future
1997	Dr Graham Ward (Peterhouse, Cambridge)	Weil, Gravity and Grace
1998	Professor David Pailin (Manchester University)	Mesle, Process Theology
1999	Professor Peter Lipton (King's College, Cambridge)	Nagel, Mortal Questions
2000	Professor Ann Loades (Durham University)	Pelikan, Jesus through the Centuries
2001	Michael Proudfoot (Reading University)	Warnock, Imagination and Time
2002	Professor John Webster (Christ Church, Oxford)	MacIntyre, Dependent Rational Animals
2003	Professor Roger Trigg (Warwick University)	Fukuyama, Our Posthuman Future
2004	Professor Anthony O'Hear (Birmingham University)	Hume, Dialogues Concerning Natural Religion
2005	Professor George Pattison (Christ Church, Oxford)	Kierkegaard, Fear and Trembling
2006	Dr Fraser Watts (Queens’ College, Cambridge)	James Proctor, Science, Religion and the Human Experience
2007	Dr Susan Parsons (Universities of Cambridge and Nottingham)	Anselm, Proslogion
2009	Dr Douglas Hedley (Clare College, Cambridge)	Kant, The Moral Law
2010	Professor John Cottingham (Reading University)	Nietzsche, On the Genealogy of Morality
2011	Dr Paolo Crivelli (New College, Oxford)	Plato, Phaedo
2012	Dr Dave Leal (Brasenose College, Oxford)	Ryle, The Concept of Mind
2013	Professor Derek Matravers (Emmanuel College, Cambridge)	Williams, Morality
2014	Dr William Wood (Oriel College, Oxford)	Pascal, Pensées
2015	Dr Clare Carlisle (King's College, London)	Lear, Radical Hope
2016	Dr Jonathan Loose (Universities of London and Cambridge)	Plantinga, Knowledge and Christian Belief
2017	Professor John Skorupski (Emeritus Professor of Moral Philosophy, University of St Andrews)	Descartes, Meditations on First Philosophy
2018	Professor Jens Timmermann (Professor of Moral Philosophy, University of St Andrews)	Kant, The Conflict of the Faculties
2019	Professor Sarah Coakley (Emeritus Norris-Hulse Professor of Divinity, Murray Edwards College, Cambridge)	Fricker, Epistemic Injustice
2020	Professor Oliver O'Donovan (Emeritus Professor of Christian Ethics, Edinburgh)	Augustine, On the Nature of the Good and Scheler, Repentance and Rebirth
2021	Dr Daniel Hill (Senior Lecturer in Philosophy, Liverpool)	H.L.A. Hart, Law, Liberty and Morality
2022	Professor Edward Harcourt (Fellow and Tutor in Philosophy, Keble College, Oxford)	Iris Murdoch, The Sovereignty of Good
2023	Professor Alister McGrath (Emeritus Professor of Science and Religion, Oxford University)	Mary Midgley, "What is Philosophy for?"
2024	Professor Nigel Biggar (Emeritus Regius Professor of Moral and Pastoral Theology, Oxford University)	Reinhold Niebuhr, "Moral Man and Immoral Society"
2025	Dr James Orr (Associate Professor of Philosophy of Religion, Cambridge University)	Harry Frankfurt, "On Inequality"
2026	Professor Brian Brock (Professor of Moral and Practical Theology, Aberdeen University)	Jacques Ellul, "Presence in the Modern World"
