= We'll to the Woods No More =

We'll to the Woods No More may refer to:

- "We'll to the Woods No More", the prefatory poem in A. E. Housman's 1922 collection Last Poems
- We'll to the Woods No More (John Ireland), a 1928 song cycle by John Ireland titled after and including a setting of the Housman poem
- We'll to the Woods No More, a 1938 English translation by Stuart Gilbert of the 1887 French novel Les lauriers sont coupés by Édouard Dujardin
