= Adrian Hollis =

English classical scholar and chess player (1940–2013)

Adrian Swayne Hollis (2 August 1940 – 26 February 2013) was an English classical scholar and correspondence chess grandmaster, the title having been awarded in 1976.

== Early life and education ==
Hollis was born on 2 August 1940 in Bristol, England. He was educated as a King's Scholar at Eton College, where he won the Newcastle Scholarship in 1958. He then studied classics at Christ Church, Oxford.

== Chess achievements ==
Hollis represented England for five consecutive years at the World Student Chess Olympiad, from 1960 to 1964 inclusive. In 1960, at Leningrad, he played first reserve board, scoring (+2 =2 -3). In 1961, at Helsinki, he played second board, scoring (+3 =3 -4). In 1962, at Mariánské Lázně, he played first board, scoring (+5 =6 -1). In 1963, at Budva, he played first board, scoring (+6 =3 -0), winning the gold medal for the best score on his board. In 1964, at Kraków, he played first board, scoring (+4 =3 -3).

He was British Correspondence Chess Champion in 1966 (jointly), 1967, and 1971; in 1982-87 he won the Ninth Correspondence Chess Olympiad, and in 1998 the World Postal Team Chess Championship as a member of the British team.

He represented Oxford University Chess Club in four annual Varsity chess matches (1959–1962), playing on the top board in the 1961 and 1962 matches. He also played in the (over the board) British Chess Championship a number of times during the 1960s, with a best placing of seventh equal (in 1961).

== Academic career ==
From 1964 to 1967, he was assistant lecturer in the Department of Humanity at the University of St Andrews. He moved back to Oxford to become a university lecturer in classics at the University of Oxford and a Tutorial Fellow of Keble College, Oxford in 1967, and remained there until his retirement in 2007.

During a distinguished academic career his research focused mainly on Hellenistic and Roman poetry. He wrote many important articles on the fragmentary poems of Callimachus and published a full-length commentary on the Hecale in 1990 (second edition 2009, with translation), but also ranged over authors as diverse as Euphorion, Choerilus, Lycophron, Horace, Propertius and Virgil. He also published a commentary on Ovid's Metamorphoses VIII (1970) and Ars Amatoria I (1977), and an edition of Fragments of Roman Poetry, c. 60 BC-AD 20 (2007).

== Personal life ==
Hollis was the only child of Sir Roger Hollis, who served as Director-General of MI5 from 1956 to 1965. His uncle Christopher Hollis was a writer and Conservative politician, and he shared a grandfather, the Anglican later bishop-suffragan of Taunton, the Right Revd George Arthur Hollis (1868–1944), with first cousin Crispian Hollis who is the Bishop of Portsmouth for the Catholic Church.

Hollis died on 26 February 2013 in Wells, Somerset, England.

== Selected works ==
- Ovid: Metamorphoses Book VIII, edited with introduction and commentary (Oxford: Clarendon Press, 1970).
- "Some Allusions to Earlier Hellenistic Poetry in Nonnus", Classical Quarterly, Vol. 26 (1976), 142–150.
- Ovid: Ars Amatoria Book I, edited with introduction and commentary (Oxford: Clarendon Press, 1977).
- Callimachus: Hecale, edited with introduction and commentary (Oxford: Clarendon Press, 1990; 2nd ed., rev., 2009).
- "Attica in Hellenistic Poetry", Zeitschrift für Papyrologie und Epigraphik, Vol. 93 (1992), 1–15.
- "The Nuptial Rite in Catullus 66 and Callimachus' Poetry for Berenice", Zeitschrift für Papyrologie und Epigraphik, Vol. 91 (1992), 21–28.
- "Hellenistic Colouring in Virgil's Aeneid", Harvard Studies in Classical Philology, Vol. 94 (1992), 269–285.
- "[Oppian], Cyn. 2,100–158 and the Mythical Past of Apamea-on-the-Orontes", Zeitschrift für Papyrologie und Epigraphik, Vol. 102 (1994), 153–166.
- "Rights of Way in Ovid (Heroides 20.146) and Plautus (Curculio 36)", Classical Quarterly, Vol. 44 (1994), 545–549.
- "Statius' Young Parthian King (Thebaid 8.286–93)", Greece & Rome, Vol. 41 (1994), 205–212.
- (with J.R. Rea and R.C. Senior) "A Tax Receipt from Hellenistic Bactria", Zeitschrift für Papyrologie und Epigraphik, Vol. 104 (1994), 261–280.
- "Heroic Honours for Philetas?", Zeitschrift für Papyrologie und Epigraphik, Vol. 110 (1996), 56–62.
- "Laodice Mother of Eucratides of Bactria", Zeitschrift für Papyrologie und Epigraphik, Vol. 110 (1996), 161–164.
- "Octavian in the Fourth Georgic", Classical Quarterly, Vol. 46 (1996), 305–308.
- "Traces of Ancient Commentaries on Ovid's Metamorphoses", Papers of the Leeds International Latin Seminar, Vol. 9 (1996), 159–74.
- "Virgil's Friend Varius Rufus", Proceedings of the Virgil Society, Vol 22 (1996), 19–33.
- "A New Fragment on Niobe and the Text of Propertius 2.20.8", Classical Quarterly, Vol. 47 (1997), 578–582.
- "Some neglected verse citations in Hesychius", Zeitschrift für Papyrologie und Epigraphik, Vol. 123 (1998), 61–71.
- "Two Adynata in Horace, Epode 16", Classical Quarterly, Vol. 48 (1998), 311–313.
- "A Tragic Fragment in Cicero, Pro Caelio 67?", Classical Quarterly, Vol. 48 (1998), 561–564.
- "William Spenser Barrett, 1914–2001", Proceedings of the British Academy, Vol. 124 (2004), 25–36.
- "The Hellenistic Epyllion and Its Descendants", in S.F. Johnson (ed.), Greek Literature in Late Antiquity: Dynamism, Didacticism, Classicism (Aldershot: Ashgate, 2006), 141–157.
- Fragments of Roman Poetry, c. 60 BC–AD 20, edited with Introduction, Translation, and Commentary (Oxford: OUP, 2007).
