= Ed Regis =

Ed Regis is the name of:

- Ed Regis (author), writer of popular science and technology books
- Ed Regis (Jurassic Park), a fictional character in Jurassic Park
