= More Poems =

After A. E. Housman’s death in 1936, his brother Laurence was made his literary executor and over the next two years published further selections of poems from his manuscripts: in 1936 More Poems and, between 1937-9, Additional Poems, although the latter were never printed as a separate edition. As much more of Housman's earlier writing was brought to light, its autobiographical nature clarified his suppressed homosexuality. There are also recognisable Classical influences.

== Editing ==
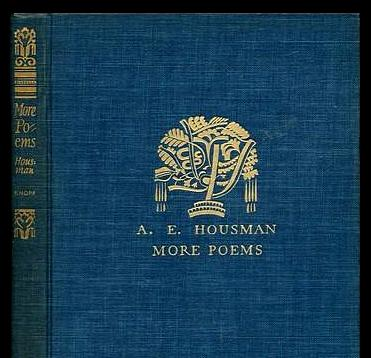
Cover design by Francis Todd for the U.S. edition of More Poems

In the preface to More Poems, Laurence Housman quoted the following instructions from the poet's will:

"I permit [my brother] but do not enjoin him to select from my verse manuscript writing, and to publish, any poems which appear to him to be completed and to be not inferior to the average of my published poems; and I direct him to destroy all other poems and fragments of verse."

Only two collections of A. E. Housman's poems had been published at widely separated intervals during his lifetime, A Shropshire Lad (1896) and Last Poems (1922). Laurence published a further 49 poems in More Poems on 26 October 1936, only a few months after the poet's death. The first impression was of 8,856 copies, followed immediately by a second impression of 5081; a later corrected third printing of 7,500 followed that. The American edition published that year had several textual differences to the British original.

A further selection of 18 poems under the title Additional Poems appeared in Laurence's memoir My Brother, A.E. Housman (1937), together with his light verse and parodies and a selection of letters. Five more poems (three from old periodicals) were added to these in the Collected Poems of 1939.

Subsequent scholarship, most notably by Tom Burns Haber in The Manuscript Poems of A. E. Housman (1955) and Archie Burnett in his edition of The Poems of A. E. Housman (1997), has deprecated Laurence's editing. Burnett charged that “The text of many poems was misrepresented: poems not completed by Housman were printed as though complete; versions he cancelled were reinstated; separate texts were conflated; and many poems were mistranscribed from the manuscripts.”

== The poems ==
Several poems in Laurence's selection for More Poems had already been considered by Housman for his previous collections, even reaching the page proof stage, before being rejected as not meeting his editorial aims there. Among them was the earnest “The Sage to the Young Man” (4), with its old fashioned forms of address, originally destined for A Shropshire Lad. It had, however, been published anonymously at a later date in the school magazine The Edwardian (April 1916). Five more, Poems 18, 26, 33, 45 and 46, had been intended for Last Poems. Among work taken from old publications, Poem 48 was one of the earliest, having appeared as “Parta Quies”, under his initials only, in Waifs and Strays (March 1881). With textual variants, it was retitled “Alta Quies” for More Poems but the original title and text were restored in Collected Poems (1939).

One of the notable qualitative differences between More Poems and the earlier collections was the greater use of a personal voice, unmediated by such fictitious masks as the rustic ‘Shropshire Lad’, on which Laurence commented himself in his memoir: “I found that most of these were more autobiographical than any that had appeared previously,” citing in particular Poems 30-33. The first two of those poems have been taken to refer to the break in relations with Moses Jackson. The intimations of homosexual feelings there were reinforced by the publication of “Oh who is this young sinner with the handcuffs on his wrists”, Poem 18 in Additional Poems, for which there is evidence that it shows sympathy for Oscar Wilde at the time of his trial in 1895.

Other personal themes occur towards the end of More Poems. “Farewell to name and number” (40) commemorates, not the death of an anonymous soldier but that of Housman's brother George Herbert in October 1901 during the Second Boer War. Again, the initials “A. J. J.” (42) conceal those of Housman's friend Adalbert Jackson who died on 12 November 1892. In the case of “For my Funeral” (47), Housman was anticipating his own death. In a sealed envelope with that title had appeared instructions that the poem should be used during his funeral service. It was accordingly printed in the four page sheet with the service order on 4 May 1936, when it was sung in Trinity College Chapel, Cambridge. It also appeared in the Evening Standard for that date. Evidence that the poem was written more than a decade before that event is given by the appearance of a translation into Latin alcaics which was published by his colleague Allen Beville Ramsay in Ros Rosarum in 1925.

== Classical influences ==
Although Housman insisted on the separation between his work as a professor of Latin and his writing as a private person, and specifically denied all but the most superficial influence of his Classical learning on A Shropshire Lad, this was not true of his other published work. Already in Later Poems there had appeared “Epithalamium” (24), with its Classical references and form, contiguous to “The Oracles” (25), which has the Battle of Thermopylae as its subject. The story of “Atys” opens Additional Poems. The account was available to Housman in Herodotus, but in this case he has made of it a dialogue in the manner of a Border ballad. In More Poems, “Diffugere Nives” is a translation of one of Horace’s Odes and had already been published in Quarto (Vol. 3, 1897) in the year following the appearance of A Shropshire Lad. Another poem, “Crossing alone the nighted ferry” (23), is based on ancient Greek beliefs about the journey to Hades, the land of death.

== Song settings ==
Of the 49 texts in Last Poems, thirteen still remain unset by composers. Thirty separate settings are due to the enthusiasm of John Ramsden Williamson (1929-2015), who also compiled some into two cycles. 4 Housman Songs (2001) included single poems from A Shropshire Lad and Additional Poems as well as Poems 43 and 19 from More Poems; 3 More Housman Songs (for baritone and piano, 2004) contained “Parta Quies” (48) from More Poems and two more from Additional Poems.

Other song-sets also combine poems from more than one of Housman's collections. Of the five in Jake Heggie’s Here and Gone (2005), two are from Last Poems and three from More Poems (14, 7 and 31); in Green Buds (1954) by Leslie Mann (1923-77), there are two from A Shropshire Lad and two from More Poems: Poem 9, which has been given the cycle’s title, and Poem 19, retitled “The Mill Stream”; in Peggy Glanville-Hicks’ 5 Songs for medium voice and piano (1952), the first two pieces are from Additional Poems, while the other three are Poems 7, 12 and 29 from More Poems. Jan Meyerowitz’s 2 Choruses (1957) for male voices and horn are settings of poems about death and burial (14 and 24) from More Poems alone.

== Bibliography ==
- Tom Burns Haber, The Manuscript Poems of A. E. Housman, University of Minnesota 1955, Google books
- Christopher Ricks, A. E. Housman: Collected Poems and Selected Prose, Penguin 1988
