= Dawn Ades =

British art historian and academic (born 1943)

Professor Dawn Ades CBE FBA
- Born: Josephine Dawn Tylden-Pattenson; 6 May 1943 (age 83)
- Spouse: Timothy Adès (m. 1966)
- Children: 3, including Thomas Adès

Academic background
- Education: St Hilda's College, Oxford; Courtauld Institute of Art

Academic work
- Discipline: Art history
- Sub-discipline: Dada; Surrealism; Salvador Dalí; Francis Bacon
- Institutions: University of Essex
- Doctoral students: Briony Fer

Josephine Dawn Ades, CBE, FBA (née Tylden-Pattenson; born 6 May 1943), known as Dawn Ades, is a British art historian and academic. She is professor emeritus of art history and theory at the University of Essex.

== Early life and education ==
Ades was born on 6 May 1943 to A. E. Tylden-Pattenson. She studied at St Hilda's College, Oxford, graduating with a Bachelor of Arts (BA) degree in 1965. She then studied art history at the Courtauld Institute of Art, graduating with a Master of Arts (MA) degree in 1968.

== Career ==
Ades has spent the majority of her academic career working at the University of Essex. She was a lecturer from 1971 to 1985, a senior lecturer from 1985 to 1988, and a Reader from 1988 to 1989. She was appointed Professor of Art History and Theory in 1989, and served as head of Department of Art History and Theory between 1989 and 1992. She has since been appointed professor emeritus. For the 2009/2010 academic year, she was the Slade Professor of the History of Art at the University of Oxford: the lecture series she gave was titled "Surrealism and the avant-garde in Europe and the Americas".

Ades was a trustee of the Tate Gallery from 1995 to 2005, of the National Gallery from 1998 to 2005, and of the Henry Moore Foundation from 2003 to 2013. She was a member of the council of the British Academy from 1999 to 2002. Since 2008, she has held the honorary title of Professor of the History of Art at the Royal Academy of Arts.

== Personal life ==
In 1966, the then Dawn Tylden-Pattenson married the British poet and translator Timothy Adès. Together they have three sons, one of whom is the composer, pianist and conductor Thomas Adès.

== Honours ==
In 1996, Ades was elected a Fellow of the British Academy (FBA), the United Kingdom's national academy for the humanities and the social sciences. She gave the 1995 Aspects of Art Lecture. In the 2002 Queen's Birthday Honours, she was appointed an Officer of the Order of the British Empire (OBE) "for services to art history". In the 2013 New Year Honours, she was promoted to Commander of the Order of the British Empire (CBE) "for services to higher education and art history".

== Selected works ==
- Dada and surrealism reviewed. London: Arts Council of Great Britain. 1978. ISBN 978-0728701496.
- The 20th-century poster: design of the avant-garde. New York: Abbeville Press. 1984. ISBN 978-0896594333.
- Photomontage. London: Thames and Hudson. 1986. ISBN 978-0500202081.
- Art in Latin America: the modern era, 1820-1980. New Haven: Yale University Press. 1989. ISBN 978-0300045611. (with Guy Brett)
- Siron Franco - Figures and Likenesses: Paintings 1968-1995. Rio de Janeiro: Editora Index. 1995. ISBN 978-8570830463.
- Dalí's Optical Illusions. New Haven: Yale University Press. 2000. ISBN 978-0300081770.
- Dalí: The centenary retrospective. London: Thames & Hudson. 2004. ISBN 978-0500093245.
- Undercover surrealism: Georges Bataille and Documents. London: MIT Press. 2006. ISBN 978-0262012300. (co-editor Simon Baker)
- The colour of my dreams: the Surrealist revolution in art. Vancouver: Vancouver Art Gallery. 2011. ISBN 978-1895442878.
- Dalí/Duchamp. London: Royal Academy of Arts. 2017. ISBN 978-1910350478. (co-editor William Jeffett)
