= A. E. Housman =

English classicist and poet (1859–1936)

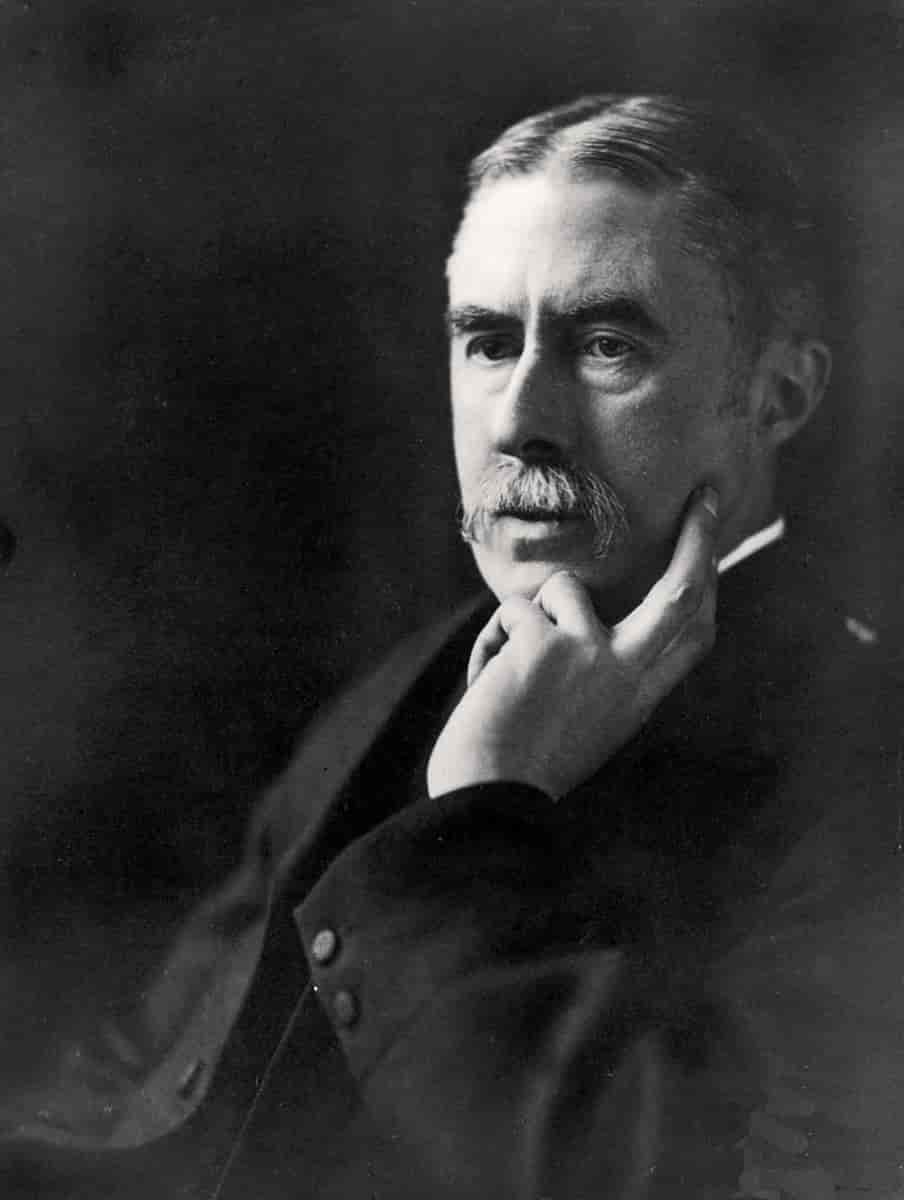
- Housman in 1910
- Born: Alfred Edward Housman; 26 March 1859; Bromsgrove, Worcestershire, England
- Died: 30 April 1936 (aged 77); Cambridge, England
- Education: St John's College, Oxford
- Occupations: Classicist; poet
- Relatives: Clemence Housman (sister); Laurence Housman (brother)
- Writing career
- Genre: Lyric poetry
- Notable works: A Shropshire Lad (1896); Last Poems (1922)

Alfred Edward Housman (/ˈhaʊsmən/; 26 March 1859 – 30 April 1936) was an English classical scholar and poet. He showed early promise as a student at the University of Oxford, but he failed the final examination in literae humaniores and took employment as a patent examiner in London in 1882. In his spare time he engaged in textual criticism of classical Greek and Latin texts and his publications as an independent researcher earned him a high academic reputation and appointment as a professor of Latin at University College London in 1892. In 1911 he was appointed Kennedy Professor of Latin in the University of Cambridge. He is regarded as one of the foremost classicists of his age and one of the greatest classical scholars. His editions of Juvenal, Manilius, and Lucan are still considered authoritative.

In 1896, Housman published A Shropshire Lad, a cycle of poems marked by the author's pessimism and preoccupation with early death, which gradually acquired a wide readership and appealed particularly to a younger audience during World War I. Another collection, entitled Last Poems, appeared in 1922. Housman's poetry became popular for musical settings. Following his death, further poems from his notebooks were published by his brother Laurence, titled More Poems (1936).

Housman's A Shropshire Lad includes some iconic individual poems like "Loveliest of trees, the cherry now" (II), "When I was one-and-twenty" (XIII), "Is my team ploughing" (XXVII) and "Into my heart an air that kills" (XL).

== Early life ==
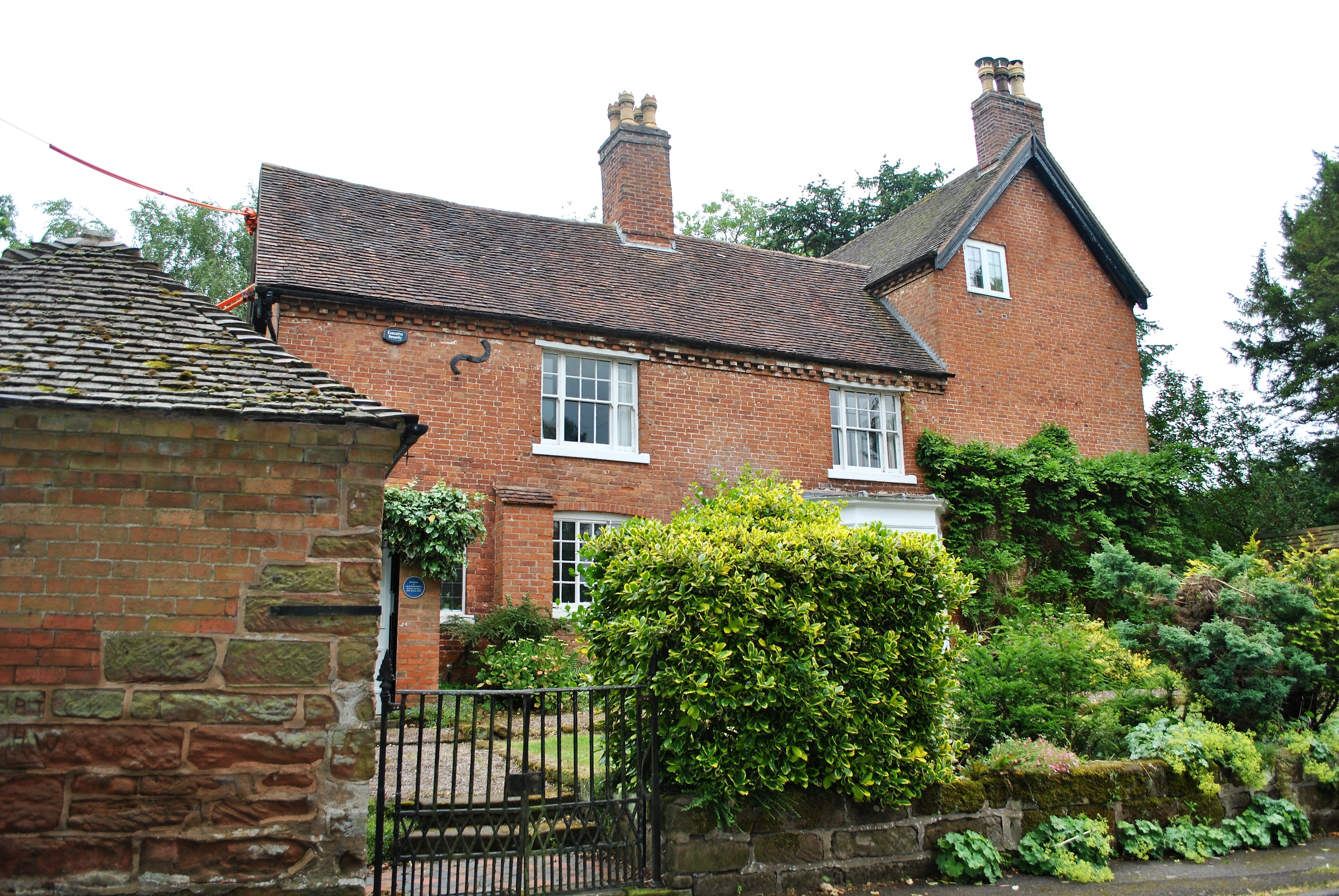
Valley House, Housman's birthplace

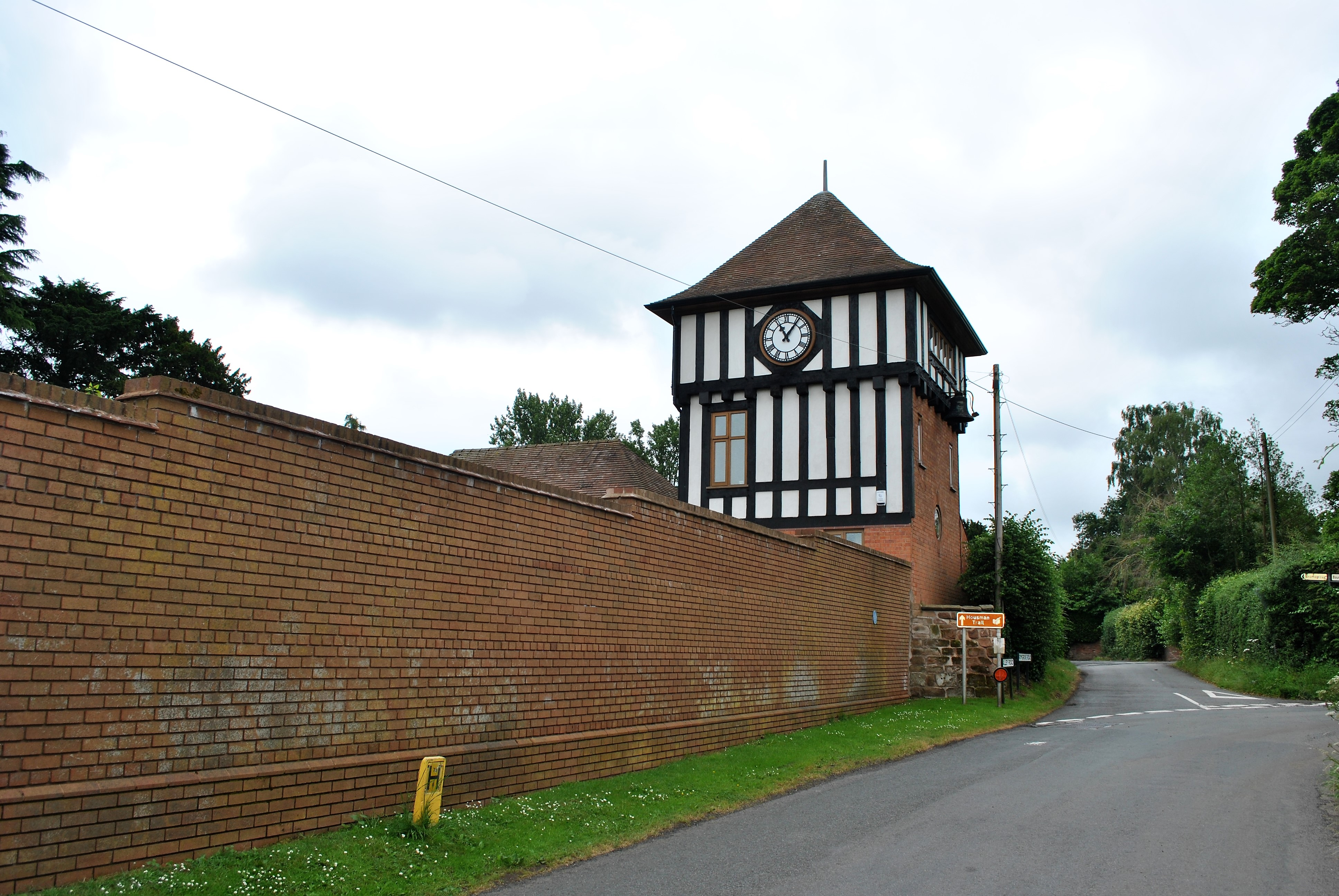
The site of the 17th-century Fockbury House (later known as The Clock House). Home of Housman from 1873 to 1878

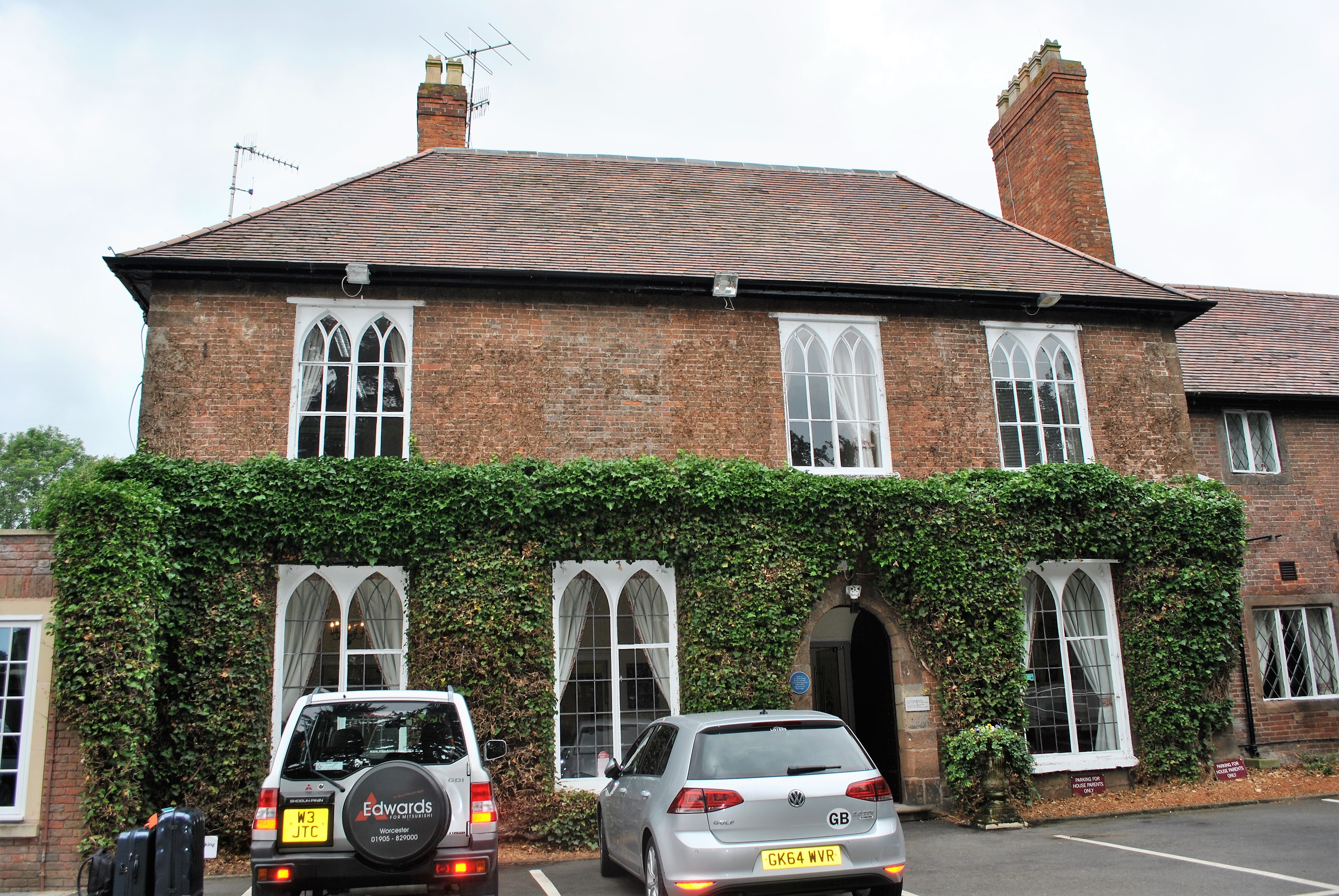
Home of Housman from 1860 to 1873 and from 1878 to 1882. His younger brother Laurence was born here in 1865.

The eldest of seven children, Housman was born at Valley House in Fockbury, a hamlet on the outskirts of Bromsgrove in Worcestershire, to Sarah Jane (née Williams, married 17 June 1858 in Woodchester, Gloucestershire) and Edward Housman (whose family came from Lancaster), and was baptised on 24 April 1859 at Christ Church, Catshill. His mother died on his twelfth birthday, and his father, a country solicitor, then married an elder cousin, Lucy, in 1873. Two of his siblings became prominent writers, sister Clemence Housman and brother Laurence Housman.

At the age of eleven Housman entered Bromsgrove School (then known as the Grammar School of King Edward VI, Bromsgrove), where he won many prizes in classical subjects, English verse, and other subjects. In 1877, he won an open scholarship to St John's College, Oxford, and went there to study classics. Although introverted by nature, Housman formed strong friendships with two roommates, Moses John Jackson (1858–1923) and A. W. Pollard. Though Housman obtained a first in classical Moderations in 1879, his dedication to textual analysis led him to neglect the ancient history and philosophy that formed part of the Greats curriculum. Accordingly, he failed the Finals and had to return humiliated in Michaelmas term to resit the exam so as to at least gain a lower-level pass degree. Though some attribute Housman's unexpected performance in his exams directly to his unrequited feelings for Jackson, most biographers adduce more obvious causes. Housman was indifferent to philosophy and overconfident in his exceptional gifts and he spent too much time with his friends. He may also have been distracted by news of his father's desperate illness.

After Oxford, Jackson went to work as a clerk in the Patent Office in London and he also arranged a job there for Housman. The two shared a flat at 82 Talbot Road, Bayswater, with Jackson's brother Adalbert until 1885, when Housman moved to lodgings of his own, probably after Jackson responded to a declaration of love by telling Housman that he could not reciprocate his feelings. Two years later, Jackson moved to India, placing more distance between himself and Housman. When he returned briefly to England in 1889 to marry, Housman was not invited to the wedding and knew nothing about it until the couple had left the country. Adalbert Jackson died in 1892 and Housman commemorated him in a poem published as "XLII – A.J.J." of More Poems (1936).

Meanwhile, Housman pursued his classical studies independently, and published scholarly articles on Horace, Propertius, Ovid, Aeschylus, Euripides and Sophocles. He also completed an edition of Propertius, which however was rejected by both Oxford University Press and Macmillan in 1885, and was destroyed after his death. He gradually acquired such a high reputation that in 1892 he was offered and accepted the professorship of Latin at University College London (UCL). When, during his tenure, an immensely rare Coverdale Bible of 1535 was discovered in the UCL library and presented to the Library Committee, Housman (who had become an atheist while at Oxford) remarked that it would be better to sell it to "buy some really useful books with the proceeds".

== Later life ==
Although Housman's early work and his responsibilities as a professor included both Latin and Greek, he began to specialise in Latin poetry. When asked later why he had stopped writing about Greek verse, he responded, "I found that I could not attain to excellence in both." In 1911 he took the Kennedy Professorship of Latin at Trinity College, Cambridge, where he remained for the rest of his life.

Between 1903 and 1930, Housman published his critical edition of Manilius's Astronomicon in five volumes. He also edited Juvenal (1905) and Lucan (1926). G. P. Goold, Classics Professor at University College, wrote of his predecessor's accomplishments that "the legacy of Housman's scholarship is a thing of permanent value; and that value consists less in obvious results, the establishment of general propositions about Latin and the removal of scribal mistakes, than in the shining example he provides of a wonderful mind at work ... He was and may remain the last great textual critic". In the eyes of Harry Eyres, however, Housman was "famously dry" as a professor, and his influence led to a scholarly style in the study of literature and poetry that was philological and without emotion.

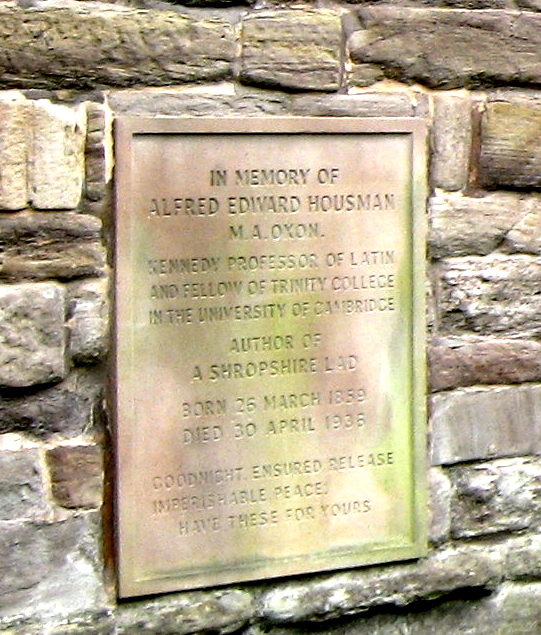
Housman's grave marker

Many colleagues were unnerved by Housman's scathing attacks on those he thought guilty of shoddy scholarship. In his paper "The Application of Thought to Textual Criticism" (1921) he wrote: "A textual critic engaged upon his business is not at all like Newton investigating the motion of the planets: he is much more like a dog hunting for fleas". He declared many of his contemporary scholars to be stupid, lazy, vain, or all three, saying: "Knowledge is good, method is good, but one thing beyond all others is necessary; and that is to have a head, not a pumpkin, on your shoulders, and brains, not pudding, in your head".

His younger colleague, A. S. F. Gow, quoted examples of these attacks, noting that they "were often savage in the extreme". Gow also related how Housman intimidated students, sometimes reducing the women to tears. According to Gow, Housman could never remember the names of female students, maintaining that "had he burdened his memory by the distinction between Miss Jones and Miss Robinson, he might have forgotten that between the second and fourth declension". Among the more notable students at his Cambridge lectures was Enoch Powell, one of whose own Classical emendations was later complimented by Housman.

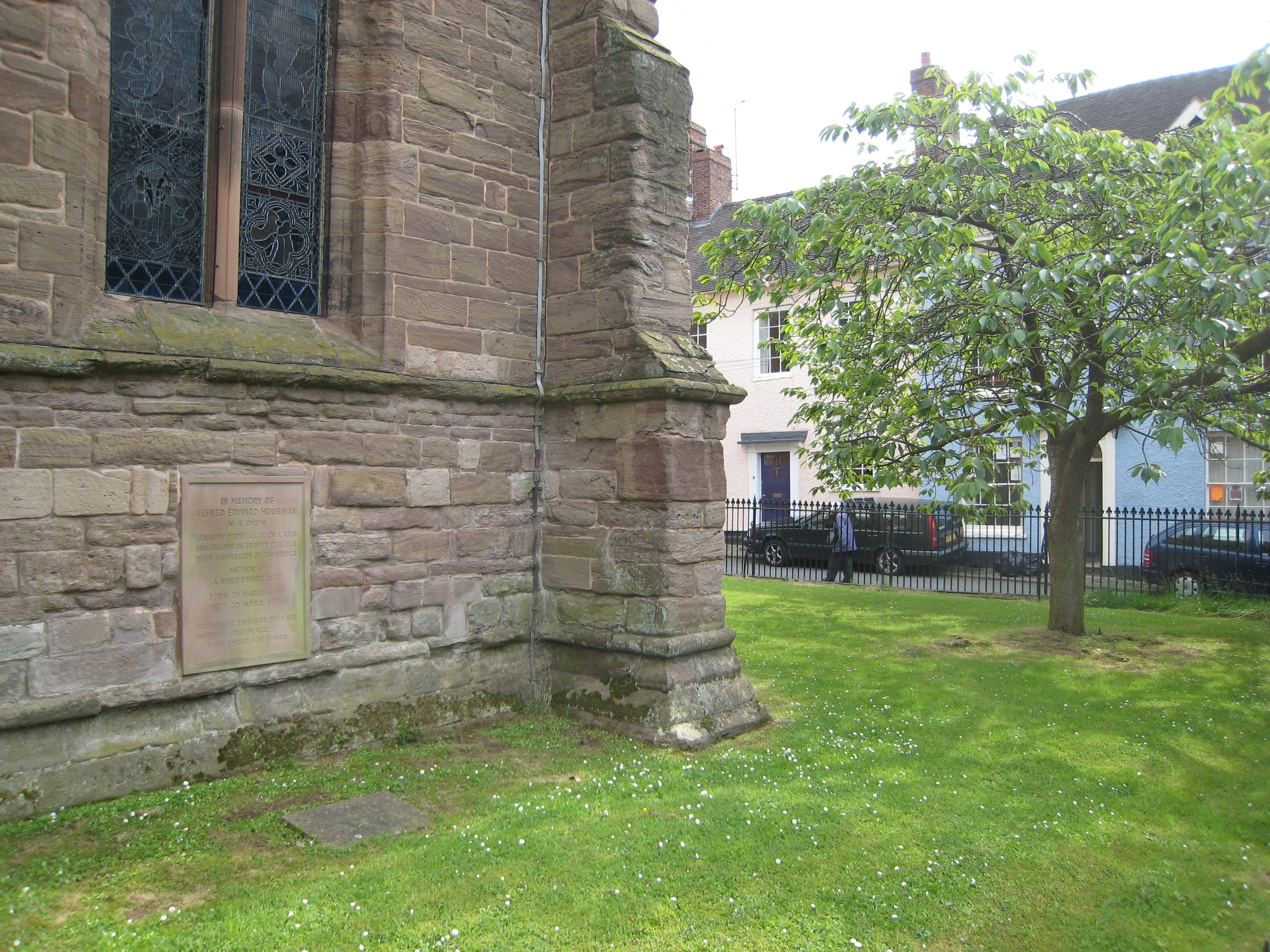
Housman's grave at St Laurence's Church in Ludlow

In his private life, Housman enjoyed country walks, gastronomy, air travel and making frequent visits to France, where he read "books which were banned in Britain as pornographic" but he struck A. C. Benson, a fellow don, as being "descended from a long line of maiden aunts". His feelings about his poetry were ambivalent and he certainly treated it as secondary to his scholarship. He did not speak in public about his poems until 1933, when he gave a lecture "The Name and Nature of Poetry", arguing there that poetry should appeal to emotions rather than to the intellect.

Housman died, aged 77, in Cambridge. His ashes are buried just outside St Laurence's Church, Ludlow. A cherry tree was planted there in his memory (see A Shropshire Lad II) and replaced by the Housman Society in 2003 with a new cherry tree nearby.

== Astronomicon ==
The Astronomicon of Marcus Manilius is the subject of the most salient of Housman's scholarly endeavours; his annotated edition he considered his magnum opus, and when the fifth and final volume was published in 1930, 27 years after the first, he remarked he would now "do nothing forever and ever." He nonetheless also thought that it was an obscure pursuit; to an American correspondent he wrote, "I do not send you a copy, as it would shock you very much; it is so dull that few professed scholars can read it, probably not one in the whole United States." It remains a source of bafflement to many that Housman should have elected to abandon (as they thought) a poet like Propertius in favour of Manilius. For example, the critic Edmund Wilson pondered the countless hours Housman devoted to Manilius and concluded, "Certainly it is the spectacle of a mind of remarkable penetration and vigor, of uncommon sensibility and intensity, condemning itself to duties which prevent it from rising to its full height." This is, however, to misunderstand the technical task of editing a classical text. In the same vein, Harry Eyres interpreted it as "what you could see as an act of self-punishment" that so many years were devoted to "a minor Roman versifier whose long didactic poem on astrology must rank as one of the most obscure in the entire annals of poetry".

== Poetry ==
=== A Shropshire Lad ===
Loveliest of trees, the cherry now
Is hung with bloom along the bough,
And stands about the woodland ride
Wearing white for Eastertide.

Now, of my threescore years and ten,
Twenty will not come again,
And take from seventy springs a score,
It only leaves me fifty more.

And since to look at things in bloom
Fifty springs are little room,
About the woodlands I will go
To see the cherry hung with snow.

— A Shropshire Lad:
"Loveliest of trees, the cherry now"

During his years in London, Housman completed A Shropshire Lad, a cycle of 63 poems. After one publisher had turned it down, he helped subsidise its publication in 1896. At first selling slowly, it rapidly became a lasting success. Its appeal to English musicians had helped to make it widely known before World War I, when its themes struck a powerful chord with English readers. The book has been in print continuously since May 1896.

The poems are marked by pessimism and preoccupation with death, without religious consolation (Housman had become an atheist while still an undergraduate). Housman wrote many of them while living in Highgate, London, before ever visiting Shropshire, which he presented in an idealised pastoral light as his 'land of lost content'. Housman himself acknowledged that "No doubt I have been unconsciously influenced by the Greeks and Latins, but [the] chief sources of which I am conscious are Shakespeare's songs, the Scottish Border ballads, and Heine".

=== Later collections ===
Housman began collecting a new set of poems after the First World War. His early work was an influence on many British poets who became famous by their writing about the war, and he wrote several poems as occasional verse to commemorate the war dead. This included his Epitaph on an Army of Mercenaries, honouring the British Expeditionary Force, an elite but small force of professional soldiers sent to Belgium at the start of the war. In the early 1920s, when Moses Jackson was dying in Canada, Housman wanted to assemble his best unpublished poems so that Jackson could read them before his death. These later poems, mostly written before 1910, show a greater variety of subject and form than those in A Shropshire Lad but lack its consistency. He published his new collection as Last Poems (1922), feeling that his inspiration was exhausted and that he should not publish more in his lifetime.

After Housman's death in 1936, his brother, Laurence published further poems in More Poems (1936), A. E .H.: Some Poems, Some Letters and a Personal Memoir by his Brother (1937), and Collected Poems (1939). A. E. H. includes humorous verse such as a parody of Longfellow's poem Excelsior. Housman also wrote a parodic Fragment of a Greek Tragedy, in English, first published in 1883 in The Bromsgrovian, the magazine of his old school, and frequently reprinted.

John Sparrow quoted a letter written late in Housman's life that described the genesis of his poems:

Poetry was for him ...'a morbid secretion', as the pearl is for the oyster. The desire, or the need, did not come upon him often, and it came usually when he was feeling ill or depressed; then whole lines and stanzas would present themselves to him without any effort, or any consciousness of composition on his part. Sometimes they wanted a little alteration, sometimes none; sometimes the lines needed in order to make a complete poem would come later, spontaneously or with 'a little coaxing'; sometimes he had to sit down and finish the poem with his head. That... was a long and laborious process.

Sparrow himself adds, "How difficult it is to achieve a satisfactory analysis may be judged by considering the last poem in A Shropshire Lad. Of its four stanzas, Housman tells us that two were 'given' him ready made; one was coaxed forth from his subconsciousness an hour or two later; the remaining one took months of conscious composition. No one can tell for certain which was which."

=== De Amicitia (Of Friendship) ===
In 1942, Laurence Housman also deposited an essay entitled "A. E. Housman's 'De Amicitia'" in the British Library, with the proviso that it was not to be published for 25 years. The essay discussed A. E. Housman's homosexuality and his love for Moses Jackson. Despite the conservative nature of the times and his own caution in public life, Housman was quite open in his poetry, and especially in A Shropshire Lad, about his deeper sympathies. Poem XXX of that sequence, for instance, speaks of how "Fear contended with desire": "Others, I am not the first, / Have willed more mischief than they durst". In More Poems, he buries his love for Moses Jackson in the very act of commemorating it, as his feelings of love are not reciprocated and must be carried unfulfilled to the grave:

Because I liked you better
Than suits a man to say,
It irked you, and I promised
To throw the thought away.

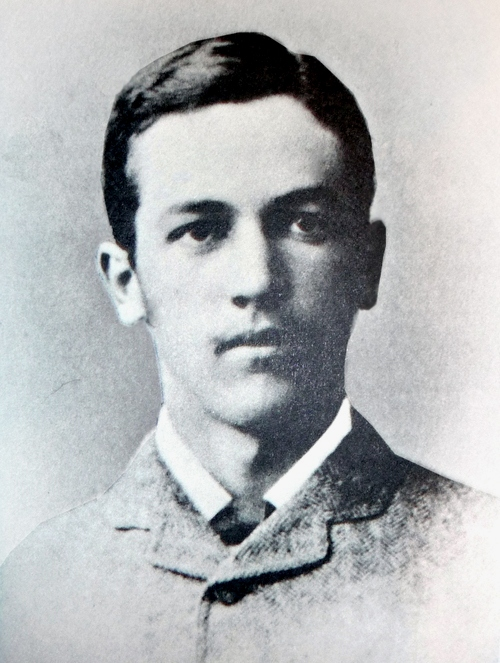
Moses Jackson (1858–1923) as an undergraduate c. 1880

To put the world between us
We parted, stiff and dry;
"Good-bye," said you, "forget me".
"I will, no fear," said I.

If here, where clover whitens
The dead man's knoll, you pass,
And no tall flower to meet you
Starts in the trefoiled grass,

Halt by the headstone naming
The heart no longer stirred,
And say the lad that loved you
Was one that kept his word.

His poem "Oh who is that young sinner with the handcuffs on his wrists?", written after the trial of Oscar Wilde, addressed more general attitudes towards homosexuals. In the poem the prisoner is suffering "for the colour of his hair", a natural quality that, in a coded reference to homosexuality, is reviled as "nameless and abominable" (recalling the legal phrase peccatum illud horribile, inter Christianos non nominandum, "that horrible sin, not to be named amongst Christians"). This refers to an old paraphrasing for homosexuality in English law.

== Musical settings ==
Housman's poetry, especially A Shropshire Lad, was set to music by many British, and in particular English, composers in the first half of the 20th century. The national, pastoral and traditional elements of his style resonated with similar trends in English music. In 1904, the cycle A Shropshire Lad was set by Arthur Somervell, who in 1898 had begun to develop the concept of the English song-cycle in his version of Tennyson's "Maud". Stephen Banfield believes it was acquaintance with Somervell's cycle that led other composers to set Housman: Ralph Vaughan Williams is likely to have attended the first performance at the Aeolian Hall on 3 February 1905. His well-known cycle of six songs On Wenlock Edge, for string quartet, tenor and piano, was published in 1909. Between 1909 and 1911, George Butterworth produced settings in two collections, Six Songs from A Shropshire Lad and Bredon Hill and Other Songs. He also wrote the orchestral tone poem A Shropshire Lad, first performed at Leeds Festival in 1912.

Ivor Gurney was another composer who made renowned settings of Housman's poems. Towards the end of World War I, he was working on his cycle Ludlow and Teme, for voice and string quartet (published in 1919), and went on to compose the eight-song cycle The Western Playland in 1921. One more who set Housman songs during this period was John Ireland in the song cycle, The Land of Lost Content (1920–21). Charles Wilfred Orr produced 24 Housman settings in songs and song cycles composed from the 1920s into the 1950s. Even composers not directly associated with the 'pastoral' tradition, such as Arnold Bax, Lennox Berkeley and Arthur Bliss, were attracted to Housman's poetry.

Housman's attitude to musical interpretations of his poetry, and indeed to music in general, was either indifference or torment. He told his friend Percy Withers that he knew nothing of music and it meant nothing to him. Withers once played him a record of the Vaughan Williams setting, but realised he had made a mistake when he saw the look of disgust on the poet's face. Nevertheless, by 1976, a catalogue listed 400 musical settings of Housman's poems. As of 2024, Lieder Net Archive records 678 settings of 188 texts.

== Commemorations ==
The earliest commemoration of Housman was in the chapel of Trinity College in Cambridge, where there is a memorial brass on the south wall. The Latin inscription was composed by his colleague there, A. S. F. Gow, who was also the author of a biographical and bibliographical sketch published immediately following his death. Translated into English, the memorial reads:

This inscription commemorates Alfred Edward Housman, who was for twenty-five years Kennedy Professor of Latin and Fellow of the College. Following in Bentley's footsteps he corrected the transmitted text of the Latin poets with so keen an intelligence and so ample a stock of learning, and chastised the sloth of editors with such sharp mockery, that he takes his place as the virtual second founder of these studies. He was also a poet who, with a slender sheaf of verses, claimed for himself a secure place on our Helicon. He died on 30 April 1936 at the age of seventy-six.

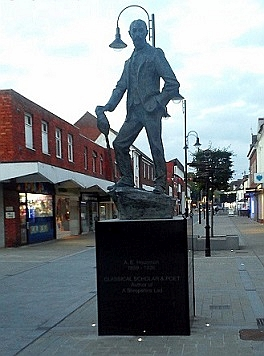
Housman statue in Bromsgrove

From 1947, University College London's academic common room was dedicated to his memory as the Housman Room. Blue plaques followed later elsewhere, the first being on Byron Cottage in Highgate in 1969, recording the fact that A Shropshire Lad was written there. More followed, placed on his Worcestershire birthplace, his homes and school in Bromsgrove. The latter were encouraged by the Housman Society, which was founded in the town in 1973. Another initiative was the statue in Bromsgrove High Street, showing the poet striding with walking stick in hand. The work of local sculptor Kenneth Potts, it was unveiled on 22 March 1985.

The blue plaques in Worcestershire were set up on the centenary of A Shropshire Lad in 1996. In September of the same year, a memorial window lozenge was dedicated at Poets' Corner in Westminster Abbey. The following year saw the première of Tom Stoppard's play The Invention of Love, whose subject is the relationship between Housman and Moses Jackson.

As the 150th anniversary of his birth approached, London University inaugurated its Housman lectures on classical subjects in 2005, initially given every second year then annually after 2011. The anniversary itself in 2009 saw the publication of a new edition of A Shropshire Lad, including pictures from across Shropshire taken by local photographer Gareth Thomas. Among other events, there were performances of Vaughan Williams's On Wenlock Edge and Ivor Gurney's Ludlow and Teme at St Laurence's Church in Ludlow.

== Works ==
=== Poetry collections ===
- A Shropshire Lad (1896)
- Last Poems (1922, Henry Holt & Company)
- A Shropshire Lad: Authorized Edition (1924, Henry Holt & Company)
- More Poems (1936, Barclays)
- Collected Poems (1940, Henry Holt & Company)
- Collected Poems (1939); the poems included in this volume but not the three above are known as Additional Poems. The Penguin edition of 1956 includes an introduction by John Sparrow.
- Manuscript Poems: Eight Hundred Lines of Hitherto Uncollected Verse from the Author's Notebooks, ed. Tom Burns Haber (1955)
- A. E. Housman: Collected Poems and Selected Prose, ed. Christopher Ricks (1988, Allen Lane)
- Unkind to Unicorns: Selected Comic Verse, ed. J. Roy Birch (1995; 2nd ed. 1999)
- The Poems of A. E. Housman, ed. Archie Burnett (1997)
- A Shropshire Lad and Other Poems (2010, Penguin Classics)

=== Classical scholarship ===
- P. Ovidi Nasonis Ibis (1894. In J. P. Postgate's "Corpus Poetarum Latinorum")
- M. Manilii Astronomica (1903–1930; 2nd ed. 1937; 5 vols.)
- D. Iunii Iuuenalis Saturae: editorum in usum edidit (1905; 2nd ed. 1931)
- M. Annaei Lucani, Belli Ciuilis Libri Decem: editorum in usum edidit (1926; 2nd ed. 1927)
- The Classical Papers of A. E. Housman, ed. J. Diggle and F. R. D. Goodyear (1972; 3 vols.)
- "Housman's Latin Inscriptions", William White, The Classical Journal (1955) 159–66

=== Published lectures ===
These lectures are listed by date of delivery, with date of first publication given separately if different.

- Introductory Lecture (1892)
- "Swinburne" (1910; published 1969)
- Cambridge Inaugural Lecture (1911; published 1969 as "The Confines of Criticism")
- "The Application of Thought to Textual Criticism" (1921; published 1922)
- "The Name and Nature of Poetry" (1933)

=== Prose collections ===
Selected Prose, edited by John Carter, Cambridge University Press, 1961

=== Collected letters ===
- The Letters of A. E. Housman, ed. Henry Maas (1971)
- The Letters of A. E. Housman, ed. Archie Burnett (2007)

== Collections ==
Bryn Mawr College Special Collections holds an archive of material relating to Housman, which includes correspondence and material related to his writings. The collection was gifted to the college by Seymour Adelman. University College London Special Collections holds letters from Housman to his stepmother and father, written between 1875 - 1901.

== Sources ==
- Critchley, Julian, 'Homage to a lonely lad', Weekend Telegraph (UK), 23 April 1988.
- Cunningham, Valentine ed., The Victorians: An Anthology of Poetry and Poetics (Oxford: Blackwell, 2000)
- Gow, A. S. F., A. E. Housman: A Sketch Together with a List of his Writings and Indexes to his Classical Papers (Cambridge 1936)
- Graves, Richard Perceval, A.E. Housman: The Scholar-Poet (Oxford: Oxford University Press, 1979), p. 155
- Housman, Laurence, A. E .H.: Some Poems, Some Letters and a Personal Memoir by his Brother (London: Jonathan Cape, 1937)
- Page, Norman, 'Housman, Alfred Edward (1859–1936)', Oxford Dictionary of National Biography (Oxford: Oxford University Press, 2004)
- Palmer, Christopher and Stephen Banfield, 'A. E. Housman', The New Grove Dictionary of Music and Musicians (London: Macmillan, 2001)
- Richardson, Donna, "The Can of Ail: A. E. Housman's Moral Irony", Victorian Poetry, Volume 48, Number 2, Summer 2010 (267–85)
- Shaw, Robin, "Housman's Places" (The Housman Society, 1995)
- Summers, Claude J. ed., The Gay and Lesbian Literary Heritage (New York: Henry Holt and Co., 1995)

Academic offices
Preceded by John E. B. Mayor	Kennedy Professor of Latin University of Cambridge; 1911–36	Succeeded by William Blair Anderson
