= Richard Jenkyns (professor) =

British classical scholar (born 1949)

Richard Jenkyns (born 1949) is Professor of the Classical Tradition at Oxford University and an historian and literary critic who has written widely on Classical and other matters.

== Education ==
Jenkyns was a King's Scholar at Eton College, where he won the Newcastle Scholarship in 1966 (the Newcastle Medal, for the second-placed candidate, being awarded in that year to Simon Hornblower), before reading Greats at Balliol College, Oxford.

== Academic career ==
Following his undergraduate career, Jenkyns was awarded a Prize Fellowship at All Souls College, Oxford in 1972. He presently serves as Emeritus Professor of the Classical Tradition and remains an emeritus Fellow and Tutor in Classics at Lady Margaret Hall, Oxford.

== Selected bibliography ==
- The Victorians and Ancient Greece (Oxford, Blackwell, 1980)
- Three Classical Poets: Sappho, Catullus and Juvenal (London, Duckworth, 1982)
- The Legacy of Rome: a New Appraisal (Oxford University Press, 1992)
- Dignity and Decadence: Victorian Art and the Classical Inheritance (London, HarperCollins, 1991)
- Classical Epic: Homer and Virgil (London, Bloomsbury, 1992)
- Virgil's Experience (Oxford University Press, 1998)
- A Fine Brush on Ivory: an Appreciation of Jane Austen (Oxford University Press, 2004)
- Westminster Abbey (London, Profile, 2004)
- God, Space & City in the Roman Imagination (Oxford University Press, 2013)
- Classical Literature (London, Pelican, 2015)
