= Timothy Adès =

English poet and translator

- Born: 1941; Esher, England
- Education: Balliol College, Oxford; INSEAD, Fontainebleau
- Occupations: translator, author
- Spouse: Dawn Adès (m. 1966)
- Children: Three, including Thomas Adès
- Writing career
- Notable awards: Premio Valle-Inclán; 2001 Homer in Cuernavaca by Alfonso Reyes
- Website: timothyades.com

Timothy Adès (born 1941) is an English poet and translator.

== Biography ==
Adès was born in Esher, Surrey. He is of Syrian Jewish origin.

He was educated as a King's Scholar at Eton College, where he won the Newcastle Scholarship in 1959, at Balliol College, Oxford and at INSEAD, Fontainebleau. He has studied both classics and business. In 1963, during his time at Balliol, he was part of the team that reached the final of the first series of University Challenge, losing to Leicester University. As a translator, he works mainly with French, German and Spanish rhymed poems, translating them into English.

His wife is the art historian Professor Dawn Adès, CBE, FBA. Composer Thomas Adès is one of their three sons.

== Career ==
He is a past winner of the John Dryden Prize with Victor Hugo's Moscow, Waterloo, St Helena and the TLS Premio Valle-Inclán Prize with Homer in Cuernavaca by Alfonso Reyes, among other awards.

== Bibliography ==
- Victor Hugo, How to be a Grandfather
- Jean Cassou, 33 Sonnets of the Resistance
- Jean Cassou, The Madness of Amadis
- Victor Hugo, The Big Story of the Lion
- Alberto Arvelo Torrealba, Florentino and the Devil
- Robert Desnos, Storysongs/Chantefables
- Robert Desnos, Surrealist, Lover, Resistant
- William Shakespeare, Loving by Will
- Ricarda Huch, Autumn Fire (Poetry Salzburg, November 2024)
