= We'll to the Woods No More (John Ireland) =

Song cycle

We'll to the Woods No More is a song cycle for voice and piano composed in 1928 by John Ireland. It consists of settings of two poems by A. E. Housman (1859–1936) and a concluding piece for solo piano named after a third.

A performance takes about 8 minutes. The poems are:

1. "We'll to the Woods No More" (Last Poems (1922), unnumbered preface)
2. "In Boyhood" ("When I would muse in boyhood"; Last Poems, No. XXXII)
3. "Spring Will Not Wait" ("'Tis time, I think, by Wenlock town"; A Shropshire Lad (1896), No. XXXIX)

John France has written, "The mood of this cycle is typically a deep sense of the fragility of life, love and friendship that so influenced both men." Rob Barnett has written of the piano piece "Spring Will Not Wait" that, "It is in Ireland’s typically elusive, wanderingly ambivalent tonal palette."
