= Great Mambo Chicken and the Transhuman Condition =

Book by Ed Regis

Great Mambo Chicken and the Transhuman Condition: Science Slightly over the Edge
- First edition
- Author: Ed Regis
- Language: English
- Genre: Science
- Publisher: Addison-Wesley
- Pages: 320 pp
- ISBN: 0-201-09258-1

Great Mambo Chicken and the Transhuman Condition is a non-fiction book copyright 1990 by Ed Regis, an American author and educator, that presents a lighthearted look at scientific visionaries planning for a future with "post-biological" people, space colonization, nanotechnology, and cryonics. The book emphasizes the personality and projects of Robert Truax, Eric Drexler, Gerard K. O'Neill, Chris Langton, Freeman Dyson, Hans Moravec, Ralph Merkle, Robert Forward, Keith Henson, Carolyn Meinel, Gary Hudson, Saul Kent, and a number of others.
