= Michael Stokes (academic) =

Michael Christopher Stokes (26 March 1933 – 25 May 2012) was a British Professor of Greek.

== Childhood and education ==
Michael Stokes was born in Clitheroe, Lancashire, England. The family moved to Oxford in 1939. Stokes was educated at the Dragon School (Oxford), Eton College, and St John's College, Cambridge, where he gained a double first degree in classics.

== Career ==
Michael Stokes taught for a year at Balliol College, Oxford. He was then appointed lecturer in Greek at the University of Edinburgh (Scotland) in 1956. He moved to Cornell University to become an associate professor in the United States in 1970. His book One and Many in Presocratic Philosophy was published in 1971. In 1974 he returned to the UK to take up a position as Professor of Greek at Durham University. His book, Plato's Socratic Conversations, appeared in 1986. He retired in 1993 to become an Honorary Research Fellow in the Department of Classics at Royal Holloway, University of London.

== Personal life ==
Stokes was married (later separated) and had three children.
