= Harry Eyres =

British journalist, writer and poet (born 1958)

British
- Born: 1958 (age 67–68)
- Education: Eton College; Trinity College, Cambridge; Barcelona University; London School of Economics
- Occupations: Journalist, writer and poet.

Harry Eyres (born 1958) is a British journalist, writer and poet.

== Biography and career ==
Eyres was educated as a King's Scholar at Eton College, where he won the Newcastle Scholarship in 1975, and at Trinity College, Cambridge, where he studied English language and literature. He holds a Diploma de Estudios Hispanicos from Barcelona University and an MSc in Environmental Assessment and Evaluation from the London School of Economics (LSE).

Eyres was a theatre critic and arts writer for The Times from 1987 to 1993, the wine editor of Harpers & Queen from 1989 to 1996, and the wine columnist for The Spectator magazine from 1984 to 1989. He was Poetry Editor of The Daily Express from 1996 to 2001. Prior to his writing career, in the early 1980s, he was a junior expert at Christie's wine department, working under wine critic Michael Broadbent.

From 2004 to 2015, Eyres wrote a weekly column for The Financial Times, titled "Slow Lane", which focused on the creative use of leisure time.

He is also the editor of LSE Environment, the newsletter of the Centre for Environmental Policy and Governance at the LSE. He teaches London theatre for a consortium of American universities.

Eyres is the author of Horace and Me: Life Lessons from an Ancient Poet (2013), Beginner’s Guide to Plato’s The Republic (2001), Wine Dynasties of Europe: Personal Portraits of Ten Leading Houses (1990), several books on wine, as well as a volume of poetry, titled Hotel Elisio (2001). He is also the co-author of “Johnson’s Brexit Dictionary” (2018).

== General references ==
- "Harry Eyres". www.ft.com.
