= Choerilus of Samos =

5th century BC Greek epic poet

Choerilus of Samos (Ancient Greek: Χοιρίλος ὁ Σάμιος) was an epic poet of Samos, who flourished at the end of the 5th century BC.

== Biography ==
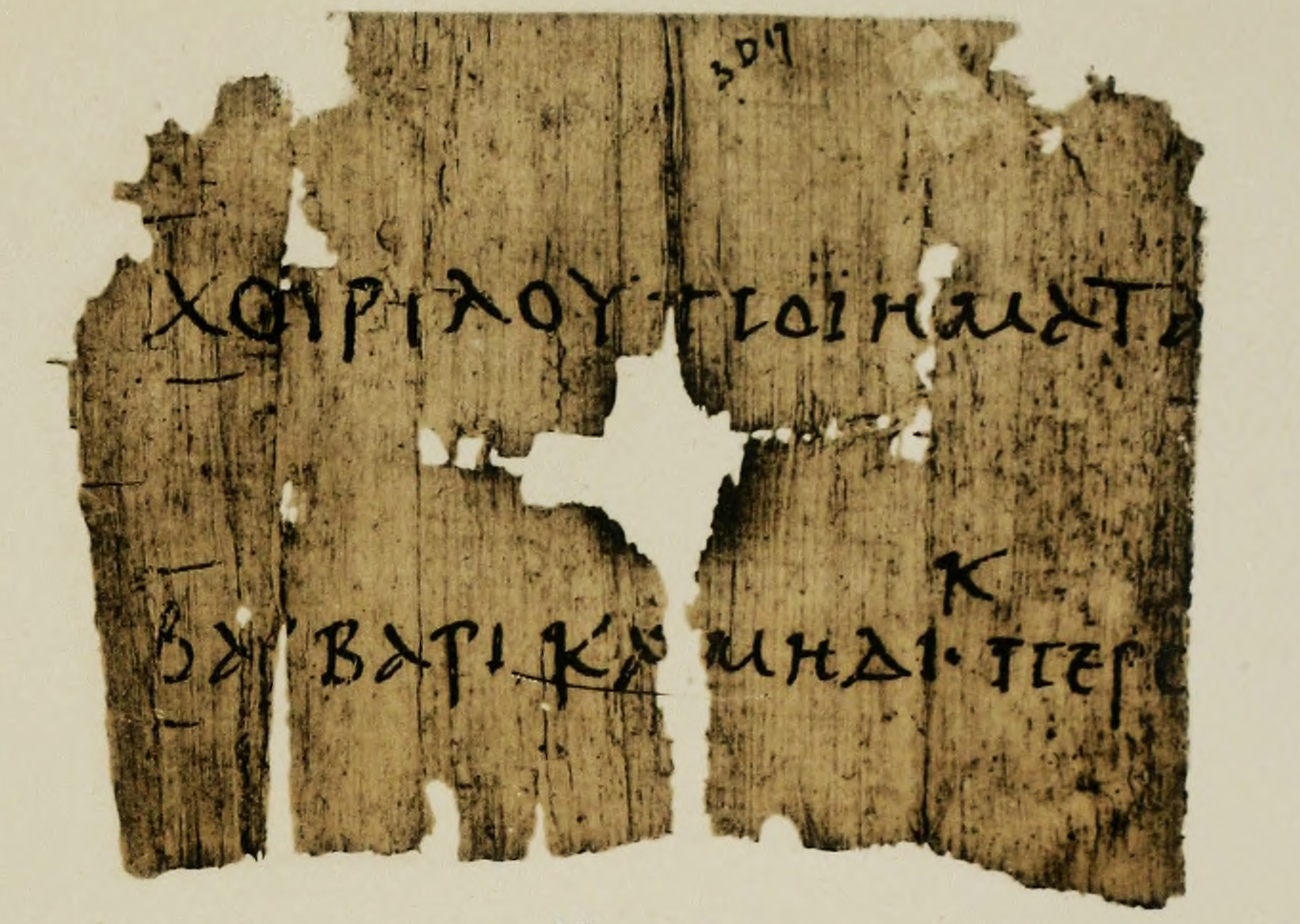
A 2nd-century CE title-tag for bearing the three titles of Choerilus' epic on the Persian War: Barbarica, Medica and Persica (P.Oxy. XI 1399)

After the defeat of Athens in the Peloponnesian War, Choerilus settled at the court of Archelaus, king of Macedon, where he was the associate of Agathon, Melanippides, and Plato the comic poet. The only work that can with certainty be attributed to him is the Περσηίς (Perseis) or Περσικά (Persika), a history of the struggle of the Greeks against Persia, the central point of which was the Battle of Salamis. His importance consists in his having taken for his theme national and contemporary events in place of the deeds of old-time heroes. For this new departure he apologizes in the introductory verses, where he says that the subjects of epic poetry being all exhausted, it was necessary to strike out a new path. The story of his intimacy with Herodotus is probably because he imitated him and had recourse to his history for the incidents of his poem.

The Perseis was at first highly successful and was said to have been read, together with the Homeric poems, at the Panathenaea, but later critics reversed this favorable judgment. Aristotle, calls Choerilus' comparisons far-fetched and obscure, and the Alexandrians displaced him by Antimachus in the canon of epic poets. The fragments are artificial in tone.

== Sources ==
- In this article, he is the second poet named Choerilus discussed. This article cites:
  - G. Kinkel (1877). Epicorum Graecorum Frag. p. i.
  - Müder (1907). Klio. pp. 29–44. Another view of his relations with Herodotus.
