= Last Poems =

Last Poems (1922) was the last of the two volumes of poems which A. E. Housman published during his lifetime. Of the 42 poems there, seventeen were given titles, a greater proportion than in his previous collection, A Shropshire Lad (1896). Although it was not quite so popular with composers, the majority of the poems there have been set to music.

== Background ==
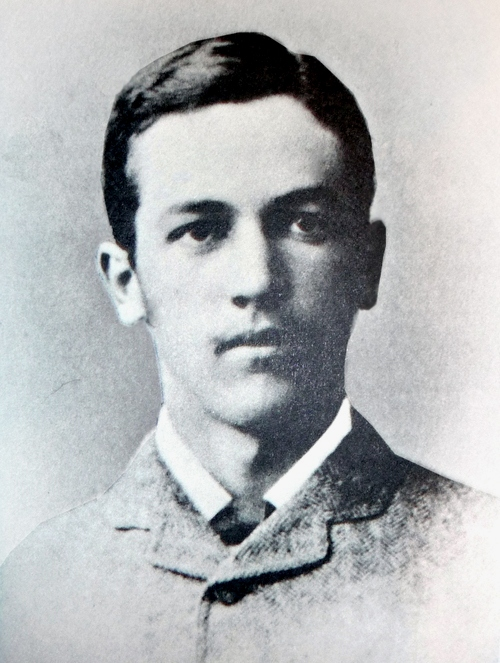
Moses Jackson (1858-1923) while an undergraduate, the news of whose approaching death inspired Housman to compile Last Poems

Housman was an emotionally withdrawn man whose closest friend and lifelong unrequited love Moses Jackson had been his roommate when he was at Oxford in 1877–82. In the 1920s, when Jackson was dying in Canada, Housman compiled forty-two poems into a volume entitled Last Poems for him to read. The introduction to the volume, dated September 1922, explains his rationale:

I publish these poems, few though they are, because it is not likely that I shall ever be impelled to write much more. I can no longer expect to be revisited by the continuous excitement under which in the early months of 1895 I wrote the greater part of my first book, nor indeed could I well sustain it if it came; and it is best that what I have written should be printed while I am here to see it through the press and control its spelling and punctuation. About a quarter of this matter belongs to the April of the present year, but most of it to dates between 1895 and 1910.

The collection was partly the result of a burst of creativity during 1922, but several earlier poems were gathered into it. Two of them, "Yonder see the morning blink" (11) and "In the morning, in the morning" (23), had originally been intended for A Shropshire Lad. Another poem from that period, “Epithalamium” (24), had been written as a late celebration of Jackson’s marriage. Some among the few that were written after had appeared in magazines and anthologies between 1900 and 1920. The most notable among these was “Epitaph on an army of mercenaries” (37), which had appeared in The Times (31 October 1917), commemorating the British Expeditionary Force on the third anniversary of the battle of Ypres. A translation into Greek elegiacs by John Maxwell Edmonds also appeared in the Classical Review that year.

Housman immediately sent a copy of the book to Jackson after its publication on 19 October 1922. He also sent the manuscript to the Fitzwilliam Museum in Cambridge soon after. The original print run of 4,000 copies sold out immediately and was followed by four more, of which 17,000 copies had been sold by the end of the year. Another measure of the importance with which its appearance was greeted, twenty six years after A Shropshire Lad, was the leader dedicated to it in The Times.

== Musical settings ==
Of the 42 texts in Last Poems, all but six have been set by composers. 29 separate settings are due to the enthusiasm of John Ramsden Williamson (1929–2015) alone. Soon after publication, composers began combining them into song cycles. John Ireland’s We'll to the Woods No More (1922) included the prologue poem of that title and Poem 32, "When I would muse in boyhood" (under the title "To Boyhood"). The history of Along the Field by Ralph Vaughan Williams was more complicated. Its first version with seven songs was performed in 1927 with solo violin accompaniment, but at that time just three were taken from Last Poems and four from A Shropshire Lad. The revised work was eventually published in 1954 as Along the Field: 8 Housman songs; in the meantime, one of the original Shropshire Lad settings was dropped and replaced by two more from Last Poems. Vaughan Williams’ student Leslie Russell (1901-1978) also included eight from Last Poems in his “Ludlow Cycle”.

There have also been settings by American composers, of which the earliest was Daniel Gregory Mason’s Songs of the countryside for chorus and orchestra (Op. 23, 1923). Later came Raymond Wilding-White’s 3 Housman Poems. Jake Heggie used Poem 20, “The night is freezing fast”, as the first song in his On the road to Christmas (1996). Later he used five Housman poems in Here and Gone (2005), of which two were from Last Poems and three from More Poems.

Despite Housman’s appeal to male readers, some female composers have also set individual items as songs. They include Rebecca Clarke’s "Eight o’ clock" (1928); "Yonder see the morning blink" (1929) by Freda Mary Swain (1902–1985); and "The Deserter" included in Elisabeth Lutyens 6 Songs (1934–1936). Post-war settings include "The night is freezing fast" (1958) by Margarita L. Merriman (b.1927); "We’ll to the woods no more" (1962) by Mayme Chanwai (b. Hong Kong, 1939); "The half moon westers low" (1965) by the American Susan Calvin; "The laws of God, the laws of man" by Joyce Howard Barrell; and "Her strong enchantments failing" (retitled as "The queen of air and darkness"), together with "Eight o’clock", by Elaine Hugh-Jones (2011).
