= Ed Regis (author) =

American philosopher (born 1944)

Edward Regis, Jr (born 1944) — known as Ed Regis — is an American philosopher, educator and author. He specializes in books and articles about science, philosophy and intelligence. His topics have included nanotechnology, transhumanism and biological warfare. His articles have appeared in several scientific magazines, including Scientific American, Harper's Magazine, Wired, Discover, The New York Times, Journal of Philosophy, Ethics and the American Philosophical Quarterly.

== Personal ==
Regis was born in 1944. He received a Ph.D in Philosophy from New York University. Regis and his wife live in the mountains near Camp David, in Maryland.

== Works ==
=== Editor ===
- Gewirth's Ethical Rationalism: Critical Essays, with a Reply by Alan Gewirth. University of Chicago Press. 1984. ISBN 0-226-70691-5.
- Extraterrestrials: Science and Alien Intelligence. Cambridge University Press. 1985. ISBN 0521262275.

=== Original works ===
- Who Got Einstein's Office?: Eccentricity and Genius at the Institute for Advanced Study. Addison-Wesley. 1987. ISBN 0-201-12065-8.
- Great Mambo Chicken And The Transhuman Condition: Science Slightly Over The Edge. Henry Holt & Co. 1990. ISBN 0-201-09258-1.
- Nano: The Emerging Science of Nanotechnology : Remaking the World-molecule by Molecule. Little, Brown. 1995. ISBN 9780316738583.
- Virus Ground Zero: Stalking the Killer Viruses with the Centers for Disease Control. Pocket Books. 1996. ISBN 978-0671553616.
- The Biology of Doom: America's Secret Germ Warfare Project. Henry Holt & Co. 1999. ISBN 0-8050-5765-X.
- The Info Mesa: Science, Business, and New Age Alchemy on the Santa Fe Plateau. New York: W. W. Norton. 2003. ISBN 978-0393021233.
- What is Life? Investigating the Nature of Life in the Age of Synthetic Biology. Farrar, Straus and Giroux. 2008. ISBN 978-0-374-28851-8.
- Regenesis: How Synthetic Biology Will Reinvent Nature and Ourselves. With George M. Church. Basic Books. 2012. ISBN 978-0-465-02175-8.
- Monsters: The Hindenburg Disaster and the Birth of Pathological Technology. Basic Books. 2015. ISBN 978-0-465-06594-3.
- Golden Rice: The Imperiled Birth of a GMO Superfood. Johns Hopkins University Press. 2019. ISBN 978-1-4214-3303-5.
