= Celles-sur-Durolle =

- Commune
- Location of Celles-sur-Durolle
- Location within France Location within Auvergne-Rhône-Alpes
- Coordinates: 45°51′33″N 3°38′10″E
- Country: France
- Region: Auvergne-Rhône-Alpes
- Department: Puy-de-Dôme
- Arrondissement: Thiers
- Canton: Thiers

Government
  - Mayor (2026–32): Olivier Chambon
- Area^{1}: 38.90 km^{2} (15.02 sq mi)
- Elevation: 574 m (1,883 ft)
- Highest elevation: 1,287 m (4,222 ft)
- Lowest elevation: 535 m (1,755 ft)
- Population (2023): 1,627
  - Density: 41.83/km^{2} (108.3/sq mi)
- Time zone: UTC+01:00 (CET)
  - Summer (DST): UTC+02:00 (CEST)
- INSEE/Postal code: 63066 /63250
- ^{1} French Land Register data, which excludes lakes, ponds, glaciers > 1 km^{2} (0.386 sq mi or 247 acres) and river estuaries.

Celles-sur-Durolle (French pronunciation: [sɛl syʁ dyʁɔl]; Arpitan: Sèl; Occitan: Cèla) is a commune in the Puy-de-Dôme department in Auvergne-Rhône-Alpes in central France. The town was known by the name of Celles until 1929.

== Neighbouring towns ==
- In Puy-de-Dôme: Arconsat, Chabreloche, La Monnerie-le-Montel, Palladuc, Saint-Victor-Montvianeix and Viscomtat
- In Allier: Lavoine
- In Loire: Saint-Priest-la-Prugne.

== Population ==
Historical population
Year	Pop.	±% p.a.
1968	2,016	—
1975	2,052	+0.25%
1982	2,041	−0.08%
1990	2,040	−0.01%
1999	1,914	−0.71%
2007	1,831	−0.55%
2012	1,767	−0.71%
2017	1,738	−0.33%
2023	1,627	−1.09%
Source: INSEE

== See also ==
- Communes of the Puy-de-Dôme department
