= Dorat =

Dorat (English: /dɔːˈrɑː/, French: [doʁa]) may refer to:

- Jean Daurat (or Dorat) (Latin, Auratus), (1508–1588), French poet and scholar, member of the Pléiade
- Claude Joseph Dorat (1734–1780), French writer, also known as Le Chevalier Dorat
- Dorat, Puy-de-Dôme, a commune of the Puy-de-Dôme département in France
- a genetically engineered, Furbyesque pet featured in Godzilla vs. King Ghidorah (1991)
