= Escoutoux =

- Commune
- Coat of arms
- Location of Escoutoux
- Location within France Location within Auvergne-Rhône-Alpes
- Coordinates: 45°49′13″N 3°33′51″E
- Country: France
- Region: Auvergne-Rhône-Alpes
- Department: Puy-de-Dôme
- Arrondissement: Thiers
- Canton: Thiers
- Intercommunality: CC Thiers Dore et Montagne

Government
  - Mayor (2020–2026): Daniel Berthucat
- Area^{1}: 27.40 km^{2} (10.58 sq mi)
- Elevation: 360 m (1,180 ft)
- Highest elevation: 829 m (2,720 ft)
- Lowest elevation: 295 m (968 ft)
- Population (2023): 1,369
  - Density: 49.96/km^{2} (129.4/sq mi)
- Time zone: UTC+01:00 (CET)
  - Summer (DST): UTC+02:00 (CEST)
- INSEE/Postal code: 63151 /63300
- ^{1} French Land Register data, which excludes lakes, ponds, glaciers > 1 km^{2} (0.386 sq mi or 247 acres) and river estuaries.

Escoutoux (French pronunciation: [ɛskutu]; Occitan: Escotós) is a commune in the Puy-de-Dôme department in Auvergne in central France.

== See also ==
- Communes of the Puy-de-Dôme department
