= Sainte-Agathe, Puy-de-Dôme =

Sainte-Agathe
- Commune
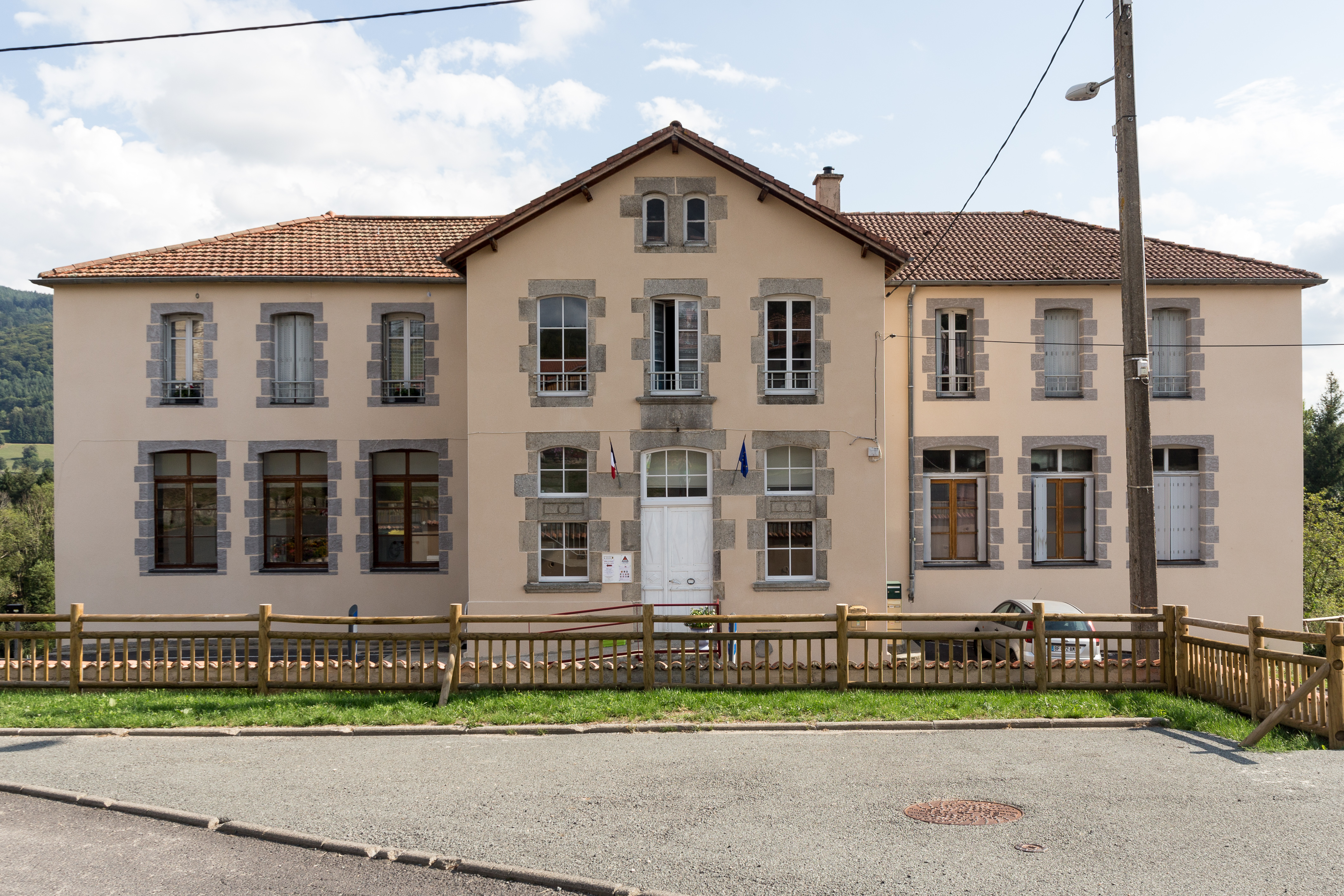
- Sainte-Agathe Town hall
- Location of Sainte-Agathe
- Location within France Location within Auvergne-Rhône-Alpes
- Coordinates: 45°49′21″N 3°36′48″E
- Country: France
- Region: Auvergne-Rhône-Alpes
- Department: Puy-de-Dôme
- Arrondissement: Thiers
- Canton: Thiers

Government
  - Mayor (2026–32): Daniel Balisoni
- Area^{1}: 18.31 km^{2} (7.07 sq mi)
- Elevation: 680 m (2,230 ft)
- Highest elevation: 1,091 m (3,579 ft)
- Lowest elevation: 439 m (1,440 ft)
- Population (2023): 171
  - Density: 9.34/km^{2} (24.2/sq mi)
- Time zone: UTC+01:00 (CET)
  - Summer (DST): UTC+02:00 (CEST)
- INSEE/Postal code: 63310 /63120
- ^{1} French Land Register data, which excludes lakes, ponds, glaciers > 1 km^{2} (0.386 sq mi or 247 acres) and river estuaries.

Sainte-Agathe (French pronunciation: [sɛ̃t aɡat]; Auvergnat: Santa Agata) is a commune in the Puy-de-Dôme department in Auvergne in central France.

== See also ==
- Communes of the Puy-de-Dôme department
