= Saint-Victor-Montvianeix =

- Commune
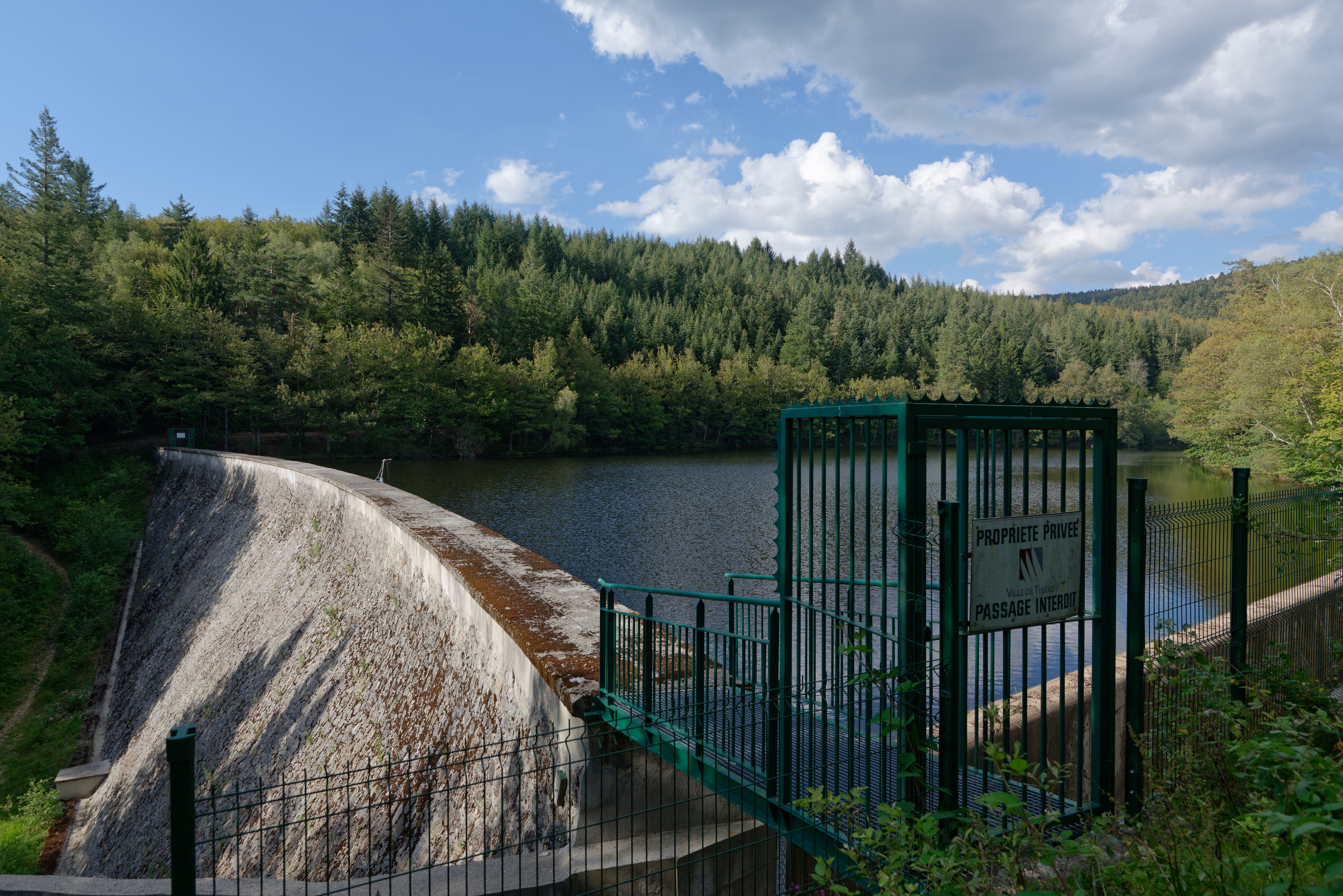
- The Muratte dam in Saint-Victor-Montvianeix
- Location of Saint-Victor-Montvianeix
- Location within France Location within Auvergne-Rhône-Alpes
- Coordinates: 45°56′28″N 3°36′14″E
- Country: France
- Region: Auvergne-Rhône-Alpes
- Department: Puy-de-Dôme
- Arrondissement: Thiers
- Canton: Thiers

Government
  - Mayor (2026–32): Serge Fayet
- Area^{1}: 45.18 km^{2} (17.44 sq mi)
- Elevation: 700 m (2,300 ft)
- Highest elevation: 1,224 m (4,016 ft)
- Lowest elevation: 319 m (1,047 ft)
- Population (2023): 264
  - Density: 5.84/km^{2} (15.1/sq mi)
- Time zone: UTC+01:00 (CET)
  - Summer (DST): UTC+02:00 (CEST)
- INSEE/Postal code: 63402 /63550
- ^{1} French Land Register data, which excludes lakes, ponds, glaciers > 1 km^{2} (0.386 sq mi or 247 acres) and river estuaries.

Saint-Victor-Montvianeix (French pronunciation: [sɛ̃ viktɔʁ mɔ̃vjanɛ]; Auvergnat: Sent Victor de Montvianés) is a commune in the Puy-de-Dôme department in Auvergne in central France.

== See also ==
- Communes of the Puy-de-Dôme department
