= Dorat, Puy-de-Dôme =

Dorat
- Commune
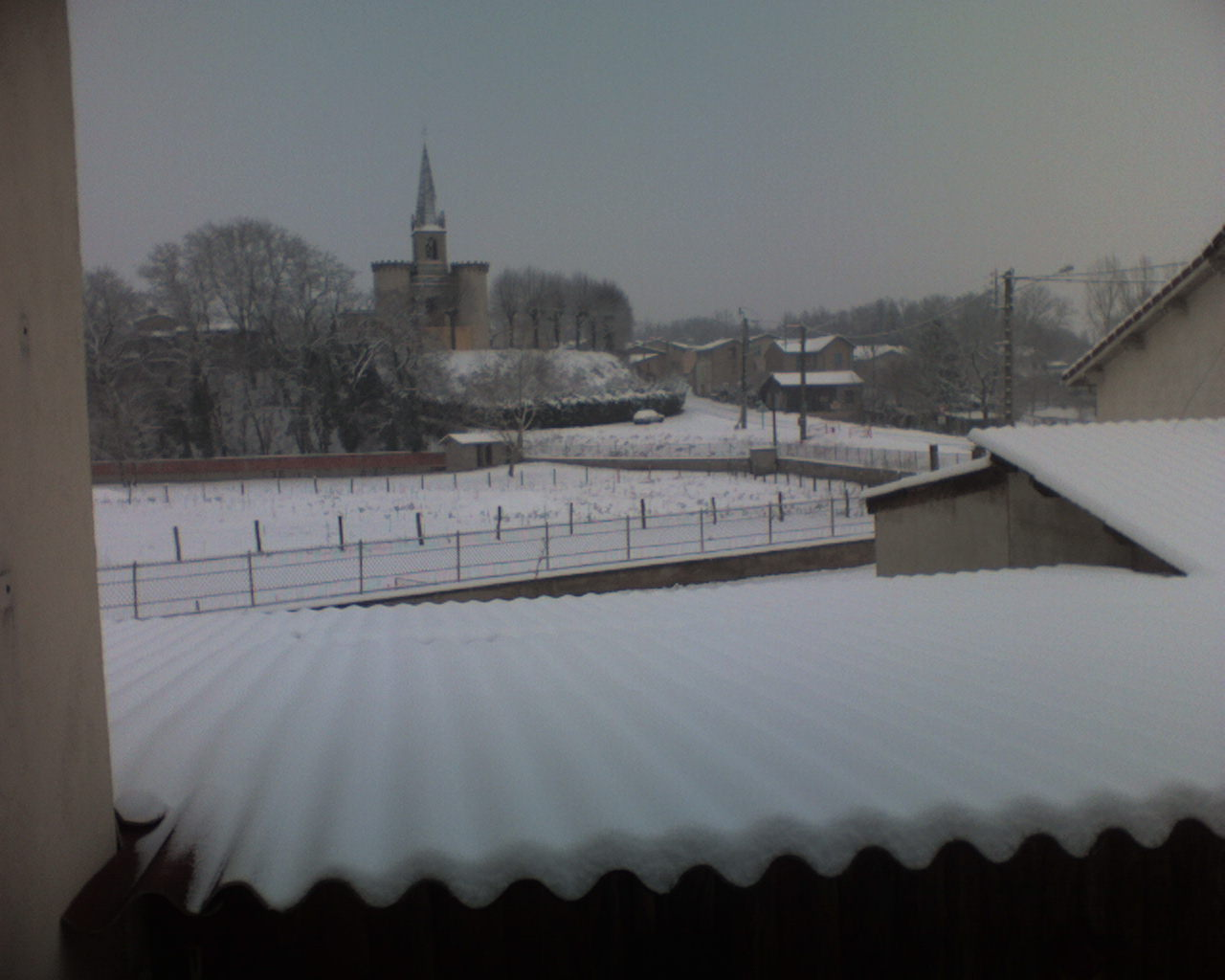
- Centre Dorat covered in snow

- Coat of arms
- Location of Dorat
- Location within France Location within Auvergne-Rhône-Alpes
- Coordinates: 45°53′36″N 3°28′55″E
- Country: France
- Region: Auvergne-Rhône-Alpes
- Department: Puy-de-Dôme
- Arrondissement: Thiers
- Canton: Thiers
- Intercommunality: Thiers Dore et Montagne

Government
  - Mayor (2020–2026): Thomas Barnerias
- Area^{1}: 17.26 km^{2} (6.66 sq mi)
- Elevation: 300 m (980 ft)
- Highest elevation: 416 m (1,365 ft)
- Lowest elevation: 273 m (896 ft)
- Population (2023): 719
  - Density: 41.7/km^{2} (108/sq mi)
- Time zone: UTC+01:00 (CET)
  - Summer (DST): UTC+02:00 (CEST)
- INSEE/Postal code: 63138 /63300
- ^{1} French Land Register data, which excludes lakes, ponds, glaciers > 1 km^{2} (0.386 sq mi or 247 acres) and river estuaries.

Dorat (French pronunciation: [dɔʁa]) is a commune in the Puy-de-Dôme department in Auvergne-Rhône-Alpes in central France.

== See also ==
- Communes of the Puy-de-Dôme department
