= Canton of Thiers =

Coordinates: 45.86°N 3.55°E

The canton of Thiers is an administrative division of the Puy-de-Dôme department, central France. Its borders were modified at the French canton reorganisation which came into effect in March 2015. Its seat is in Thiers.

It consists of the following communes:

1. Arconsat
2. Celles-sur-Durolle
3. Chabreloche
4. Dorat
5. Escoutoux
6. La Monnerie-le-Montel
7. Palladuc
8. Sainte-Agathe
9. Saint-Rémy-sur-Durolle
10. Saint-Victor-Montvianeix
11. Thiers
12. Viscomtat
13. Vollore-Montagne
