= Saint-Rémy-sur-Durolle =

- Commune
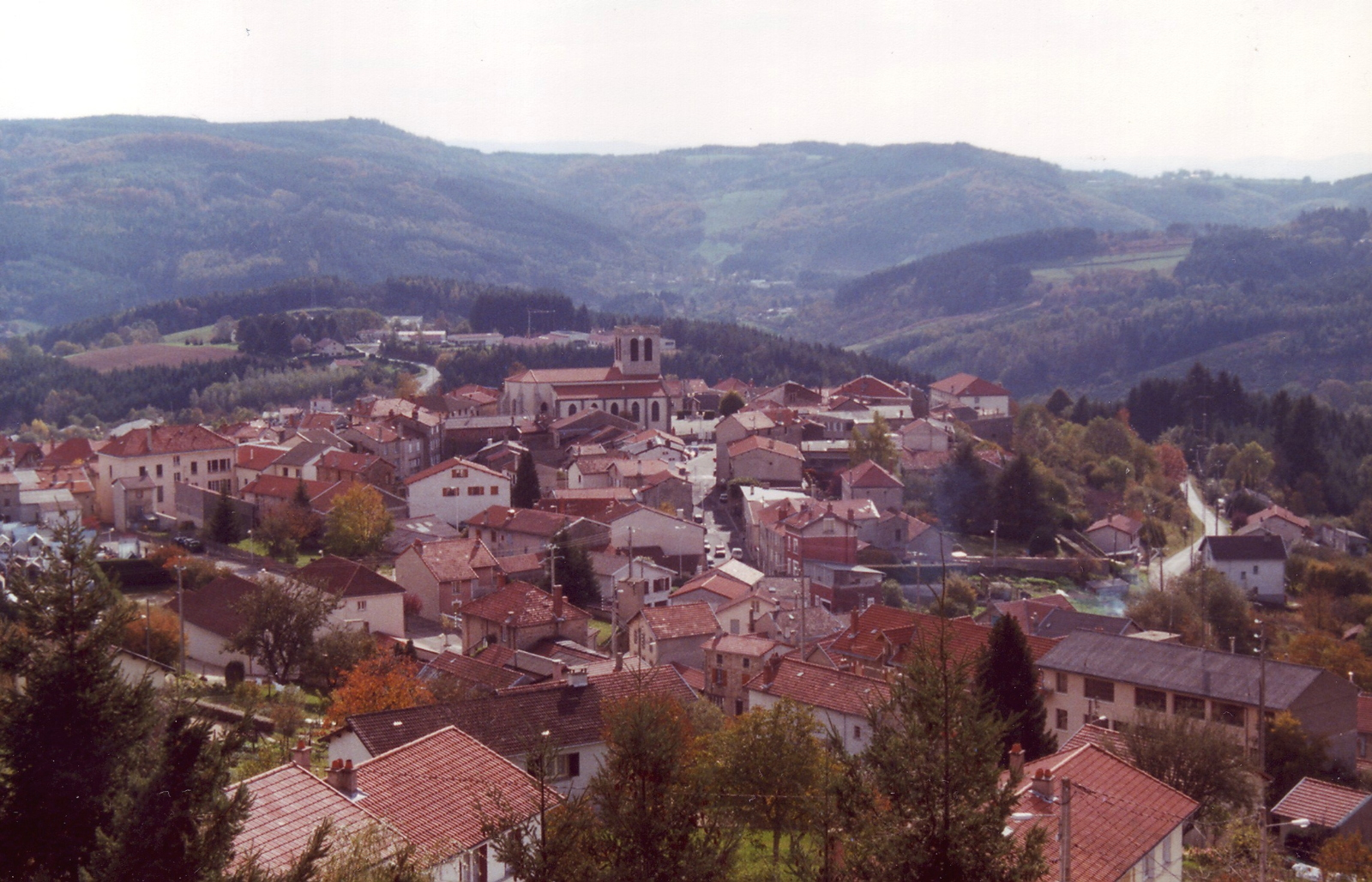
- A general view of Saint-Rémy-sur-Durolle

- Coat of arms
- Location of Saint-Rémy-sur-Durolle
- Location within France Location within Auvergne-Rhône-Alpes
- Coordinates: 45°53′19″N 3°35′36″E
- Country: France
- Region: Auvergne-Rhône-Alpes
- Department: Puy-de-Dôme
- Arrondissement: Thiers
- Canton: Thiers

Government
  - Mayor (2026–32): Frédéric Chonier
- Area^{1}: 18.17 km^{2} (7.02 sq mi)
- Elevation: 672 m (2,205 ft)
- Highest elevation: 947 m (3,107 ft)
- Lowest elevation: 500 m (1,600 ft)
- Population (2023): 1,746
  - Density: 96.09/km^{2} (248.9/sq mi)
- Time zone: UTC+01:00 (CET)
  - Summer (DST): UTC+02:00 (CEST)
- INSEE/Postal code: 63393 /63550
- ^{1} French Land Register data, which excludes lakes, ponds, glaciers > 1 km^{2} (0.386 sq mi or 247 acres) and river estuaries.

Saint-Rémy-sur-Durolle (French pronunciation: [sɛ̃ ʁemi syʁ dyʁɔl]; Auvergnat: Sant Ramèi) is a commune in the Puy-de-Dôme department in Auvergne in central France.

== See also ==
- Communes of the Puy-de-Dôme department
