= Arconsat =

- Commune
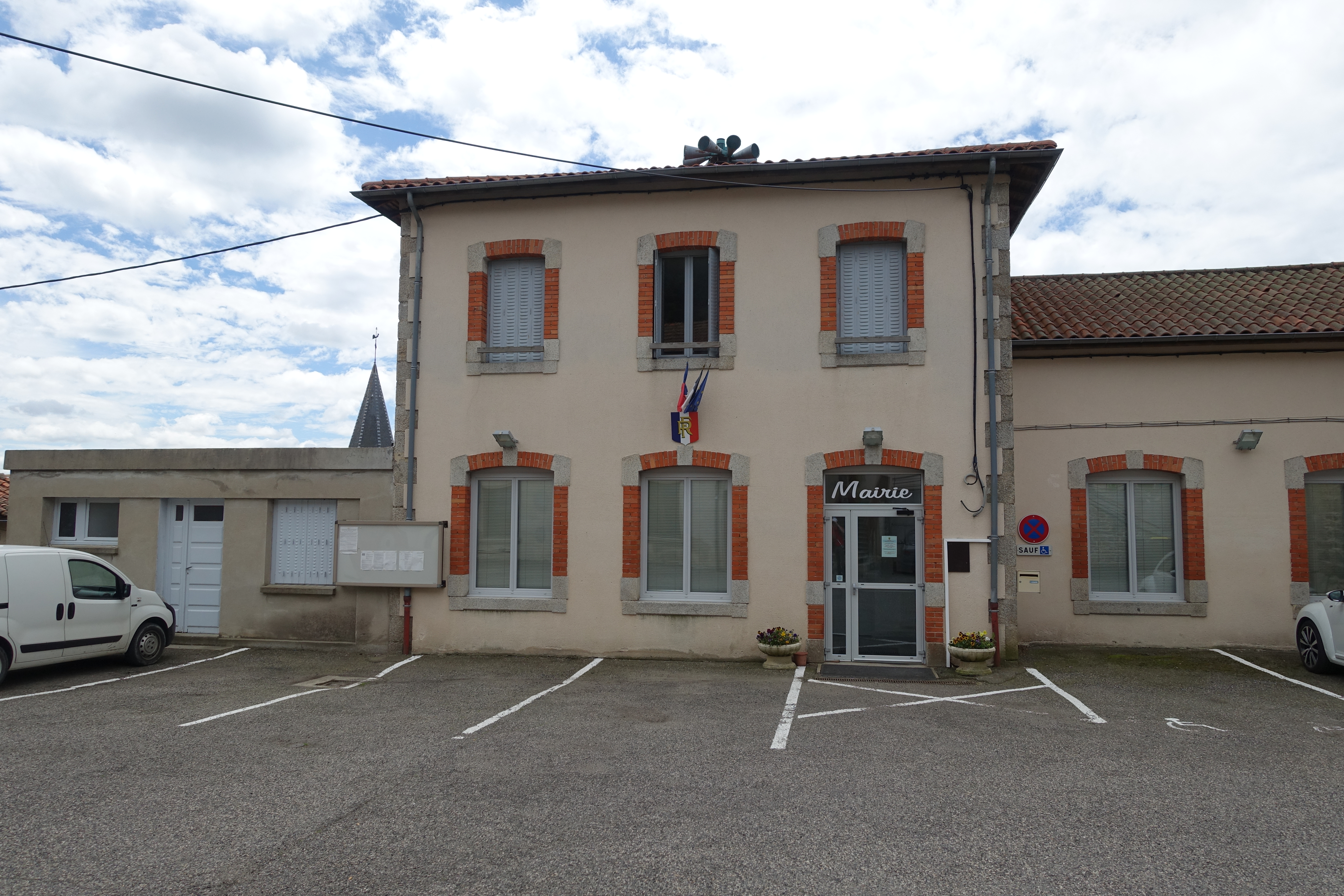
- The town hall in Arconsat

- Coat of arms
- Location of Arconsat
- Location within France Location within Auvergne-Rhône-Alpes
- Coordinates: 45°53′23″N 3°42′50″E
- Country: France
- Region: Auvergne-Rhône-Alpes
- Department: Puy-de-Dôme
- Arrondissement: Thiers
- Canton: Thiers
- Intercommunality: Thiers Dore et Montagne

Government
  - Mayor (2026–32): Jean-Eric Garret
- Area^{1}: 22.63 km^{2} (8.74 sq mi)
- Elevation: 800 m (2,600 ft)
- Highest elevation: 1,287 m (4,222 ft)
- Lowest elevation: 631 m (2,070 ft)
- Population (2023): 565
  - Density: 25.0/km^{2} (64.7/sq mi)
- Time zone: UTC+01:00 (CET)
  - Summer (DST): UTC+02:00 (CEST)
- INSEE/Postal code: 63008 /63250
- ^{1} French Land Register data, which excludes lakes, ponds, glaciers > 1 km^{2} (0.386 sq mi or 247 acres) and river estuaries.

Arconsat (French pronunciation: [aʁkɔ̃sa]; Arpitan: Àrkònsà; Occitan: Riconçac) is a commune in the Puy-de-Dôme department in Auvergne-Rhône-Alpes in central France. It also qualifies itself as "World home of the Saucisse de choux d'Arconsat".

== Population ==
Historical population

Year	Pop.	±% p.a.
1876	1,237	—
1921	1,005	−0.46%
1962	787	−0.59%
1968	815	+0.58%
1975	782	−0.59%
1982	779	−0.05%

Year	Pop.	±% p.a.
1990	724	−0.91%
1999	717	−0.11%
2007	659	−1.05%
2012	633	−0.80%
2017	604	−0.93%
2023	565	−1.11%

Source: EHESS and INSEE

== See also ==
- Communes of the Puy-de-Dôme department
