= La Monnerie-le-Montel =

- Commune
- Location of La Monnerie-le-Montel
- Location within France Location within Auvergne-Rhône-Alpes
- Coordinates: 45°52′19″N 3°36′07″E
- Country: France
- Region: Auvergne-Rhône-Alpes
- Department: Puy-de-Dôme
- Arrondissement: Thiers
- Canton: Thiers
- Intercommunality: Thiers Dore et Montagne

Government
  - Mayor (2026–32): Chantal Chassang
- Area^{1}: 4.65 km^{2} (1.80 sq mi)
- Elevation: 539 m (1,768 ft)
- Highest elevation: 696 m (2,283 ft)
- Lowest elevation: 519 m (1,703 ft)
- Population (2023): 1,647
  - Density: 354/km^{2} (917/sq mi)
- Time zone: UTC+01:00 (CET)
  - Summer (DST): UTC+02:00 (CEST)
- INSEE/Postal code: 63231 /63650
- ^{1} French Land Register data, which excludes lakes, ponds, glaciers > 1 km^{2} (0.386 sq mi or 247 acres) and river estuaries.

La Monnerie-le-Montel (French pronunciation: [la mɔnʁi lə mɔ̃tɛl]) is a commune in the Puy-de-Dôme department in Auvergne-Rhône-Alpes in central France.

== See also ==
- Communes of the Puy-de-Dôme department
