= Viscomtat =

- Commune
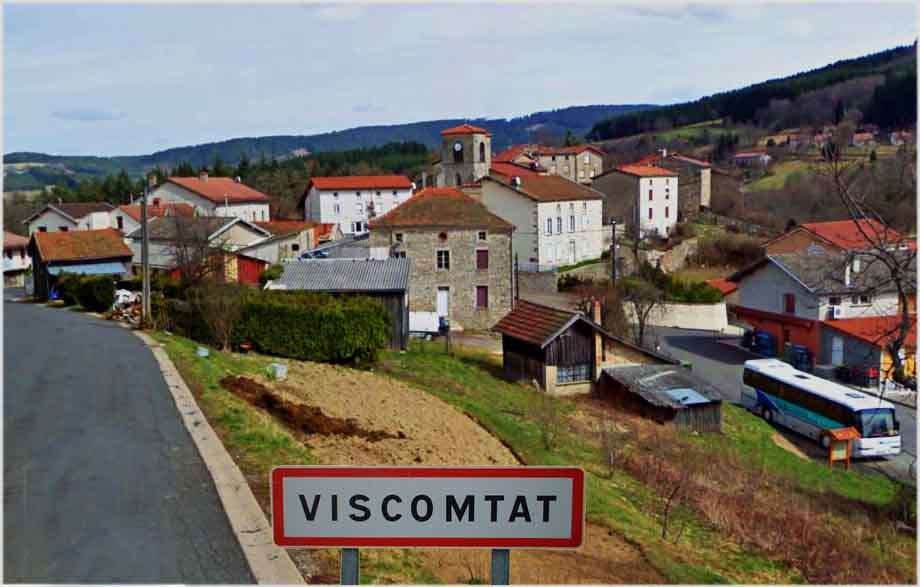
- A general view of Viscomtat

- Coat of arms
- Location of Viscomtat
- Location within France Location within Auvergne-Rhône-Alpes
- Coordinates: 45°49′45″N 3°40′37″E
- Country: France
- Region: Auvergne-Rhône-Alpes
- Department: Puy-de-Dôme
- Arrondissement: Thiers
- Canton: Thiers
- Intercommunality: Thiers Dore et Montagne

Government
  - Mayor (2026–32): Didier Cornet
- Area^{1}: 25.44 km^{2} (9.82 sq mi)
- Elevation: 700 m (2,300 ft)
- Highest elevation: 1,123 m (3,684 ft)
- Lowest elevation: 606 m (1,988 ft)
- Population (2023): 501
  - Density: 19.7/km^{2} (51.0/sq mi)
- Time zone: UTC+01:00 (CET)
  - Summer (DST): UTC+02:00 (CEST)
- INSEE/Postal code: 63463 /63250
- ^{1} French Land Register data, which excludes lakes, ponds, glaciers > 1 km^{2} (0.386 sq mi or 247 acres) and river estuaries.

Viscomtat (French pronunciation: [viskɔ̃ta]) is a commune in the Puy-de-Dôme department in Auvergne in central France.

== See also ==
- Communes of the Puy-de-Dôme department
