= Palladuc =

- Commune
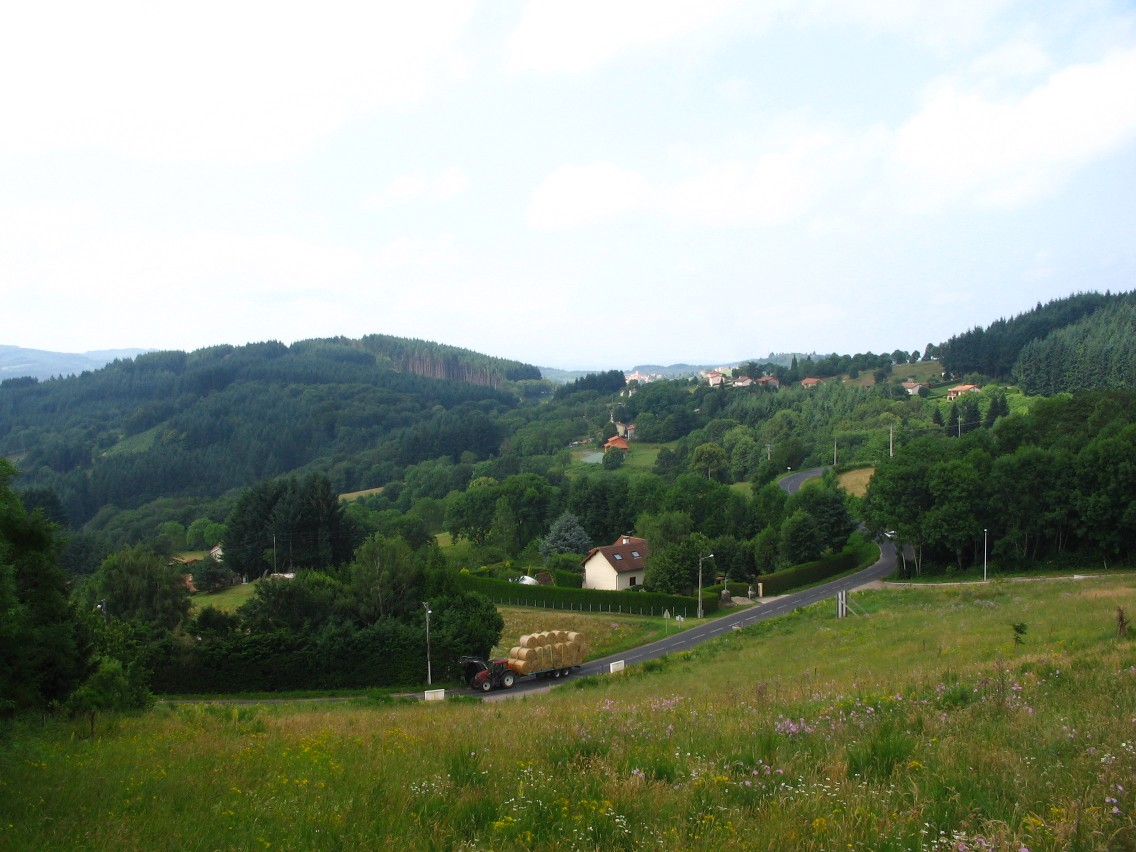
- A general view of Palladuc
- Location of Palladuc
- Location within France Location within Auvergne-Rhône-Alpes
- Coordinates: 45°54′18″N 3°37′44″E
- Country: France
- Region: Auvergne-Rhône-Alpes
- Department: Puy-de-Dôme
- Arrondissement: Thiers
- Canton: Thiers
- Intercommunality: Thiers Dore et Montagne

Government
  - Mayor (2026–32): Caroline Guélon
- Area^{1}: 13.35 km^{2} (5.15 sq mi)
- Elevation: 749 m (2,457 ft)
- Highest elevation: 1,287 m (4,222 ft)
- Lowest elevation: 587 m (1,926 ft)
- Population (2023): 517
  - Density: 38.7/km^{2} (100/sq mi)
- Time zone: UTC+01:00 (CET)
  - Summer (DST): UTC+02:00 (CEST)
- INSEE/Postal code: 63267 /63550
- ^{1} French Land Register data, which excludes lakes, ponds, glaciers > 1 km^{2} (0.386 sq mi or 247 acres) and river estuaries.

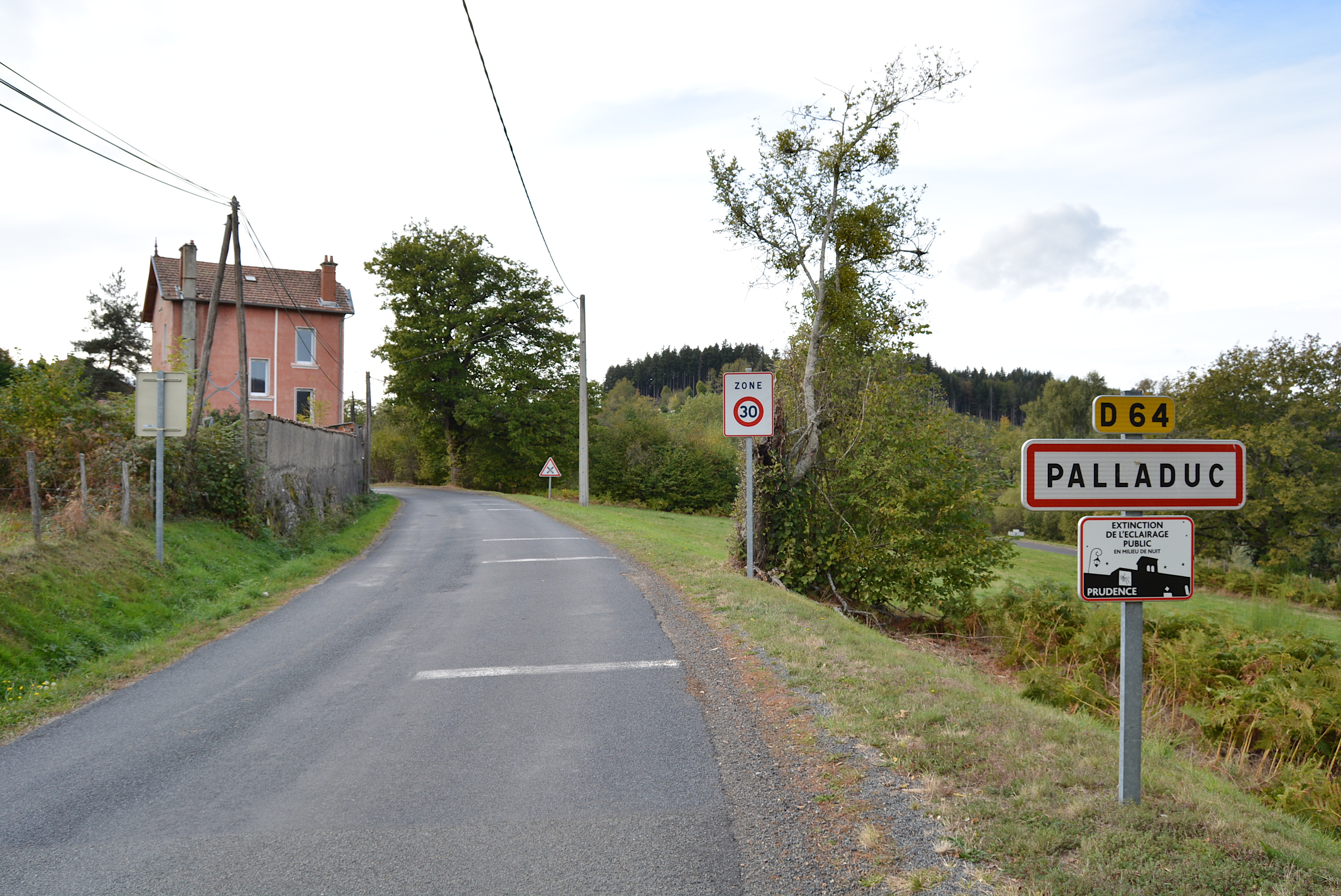
Entering Palladuc

Palladuc (French pronunciation: [paladyk]; Arpitan: Pàlàduk) is a commune in the Puy-de-Dôme department in Auvergne-Rhône-Alpes in central France. In 2023 the population was estimated to be 517.

== See also ==
- Communes of the Puy-de-Dôme department
