= Chabreloche =

- Commune
- Location of Chabreloche
- Location within France Location within Auvergne-Rhône-Alpes
- Coordinates: 45°52′47″N 3°41′51″E
- Country: France
- Region: Auvergne-Rhône-Alpes
- Department: Puy-de-Dôme
- Arrondissement: Thiers
- Canton: Thiers

Government
  - Mayor (2026–32): Jean-Pierre Dubost
- Area^{1}: 9.61 km^{2} (3.71 sq mi)
- Elevation: 620 m (2,030 ft)
- Highest elevation: 913 m (2,995 ft)
- Lowest elevation: 597 m (1,959 ft)
- Population (2023): 1,156
  - Density: 120/km^{2} (312/sq mi)
- Time zone: UTC+01:00 (CET)
  - Summer (DST): UTC+02:00 (CEST)
- INSEE/Postal code: 63072 /63250
- ^{1} French Land Register data, which excludes lakes, ponds, glaciers > 1 km^{2} (0.386 sq mi or 247 acres) and river estuaries.

Chabreloche (French pronunciation: [ʃabʁəlɔʃ]; Arpitan: Chàbrelòche; Occitan: Chabralòcha) is a commune in the Puy-de-Dôme department in Auvergne-Rhône-Alpes in central France.

== See also ==
- Communes of the Puy-de-Dôme department
