= Chéron =

Chéron is a French surname. Notable people with the surname include:

- Aimée Julie Cheron (1821–c.1890), French painter
- André Cheron (1880–1952), American character actor
- André Chéron (1895–1980), French chess player
- Élisabeth Sophie Chéron (1648–1711), French painter
- François Chéron (1764–1829), one of the Administrators of the Comédie-Française
- Guy Cheron (* 1955), professor of neurophysiology and movement biomechanics
- Louis Chéron (1660–1725), French painter, and a founder of the St. Martin's Lane Academy, London
- Pierre Nicholas Le Chéron d'Incarville (1706–1757), French Jesuit and amateur botanist
- Louis-Claude Chéron de La Bruyère (1758–1807), French playwright, translator and politician

== See also ==
- Cheron, a fictional planet in the Star Trek episode "Let That Be Your Last Battlefield"
- Saint-Chéron (disambiguation)
