= Brugière =

Brugière is a surname. Notable people with the surname include:

- Amable Guillaume Prosper Brugière (1782–1866), French statesman and historian
- Pierre Brugière (1730–1803), French priest and Jansenist

== See also ==
- Brugère
