= La Bruyère =

La Bruyère may refer to:

- La Bruyère, Belgium, a municipality
- La Bruyère, Haute-Saône, a commune in France
- Jean de La Bruyère (1645–1696), French essayist and moralist
- Louis-Claude Chéron de La Bruyère (1758–1807), French playwright, translator and politician

== See also ==
- Labruyère (disambiguation)
- Bruyère (disambiguation)
- Bruguière, a surname
