= Bruyère =

Bruyère is a French name (the word bruyère means heather in French or a place where heather grows, brugière derives from it).

The family name Bruyère may refer to:

- Bernard Bruyère (1879–1971), French Egyptologist
- Élisabeth Bruyère or Bruguier (1818–1876), the Canadian founder of the Sisters of Charity of Bytown
- Francesco Bruyere (1980), an Italian judoka
- Jean de La Bruyère (1645–1696), French essayist and moralist, also known for his writing skills shown in his "The Characters, or the Manners of the Age, with The Characters of Theophrastus"
- Jean Pierre Joseph Bruyère or Bruguière (1772–1813), French cavalry general of the Napoleonic Wars
- Joseph Bruyère (1948), a former Belgian cyclist
- Marie-Louise Bruyère, a.k.a. Madame Bruyère, a French fashion designer who worked from 1928 until the 1950s
- Robin Bruyère (born 1992), Belgian politician
- Véronique Bruyère, Belgian computer scientist

== See also ==
- Bruyères
- La Bruyère (disambiguation)
- Bruguière
- Brugère
