= Leisure centre of Iloa =

Leisure center in Thiers, France

Coordinates: 45.868°N 3.483°E

Logo of ILOA Les Rives de Thiers.

The Leisure center of ILOA Les Rives de Thiers is a leisure centre located in Thiers in the department of Puy-de-Dôme in the region Auvergne-Rhône-Alpes. The leisure center is the largest of Auvergne with more than 70 hectares (0.7 km^{2}).

Open largely in the middle of the 1980s, several buildings were stopped building in 1989. The leisure center is installed between the Dore river, the RD44 (Department Road) and the railroad line of Clermont-Thiers-Boën. The whole site is protected by the European network Natura 2000 and by the Livradois-Forez Regional Natural Park.

== Gallery ==
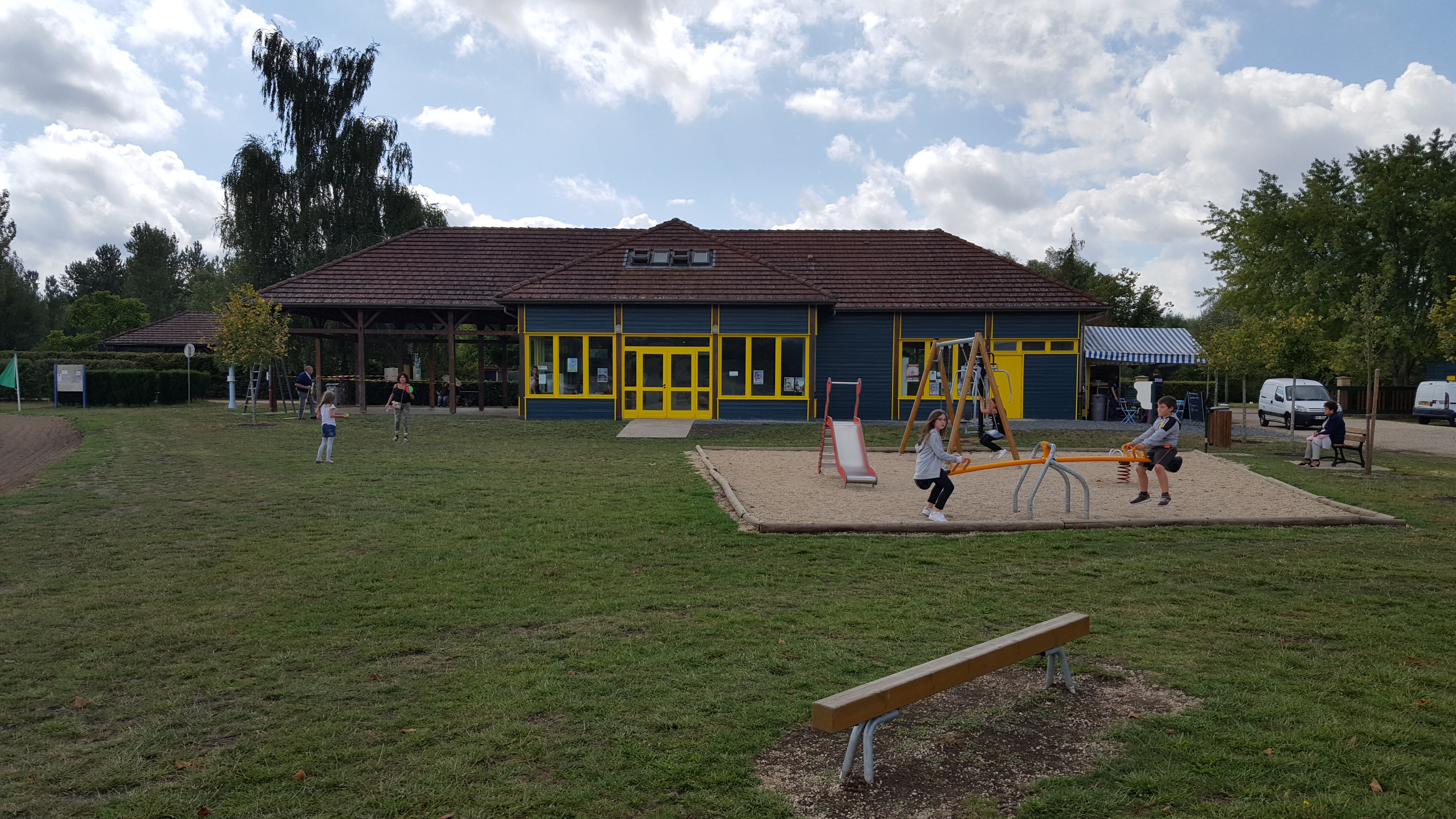

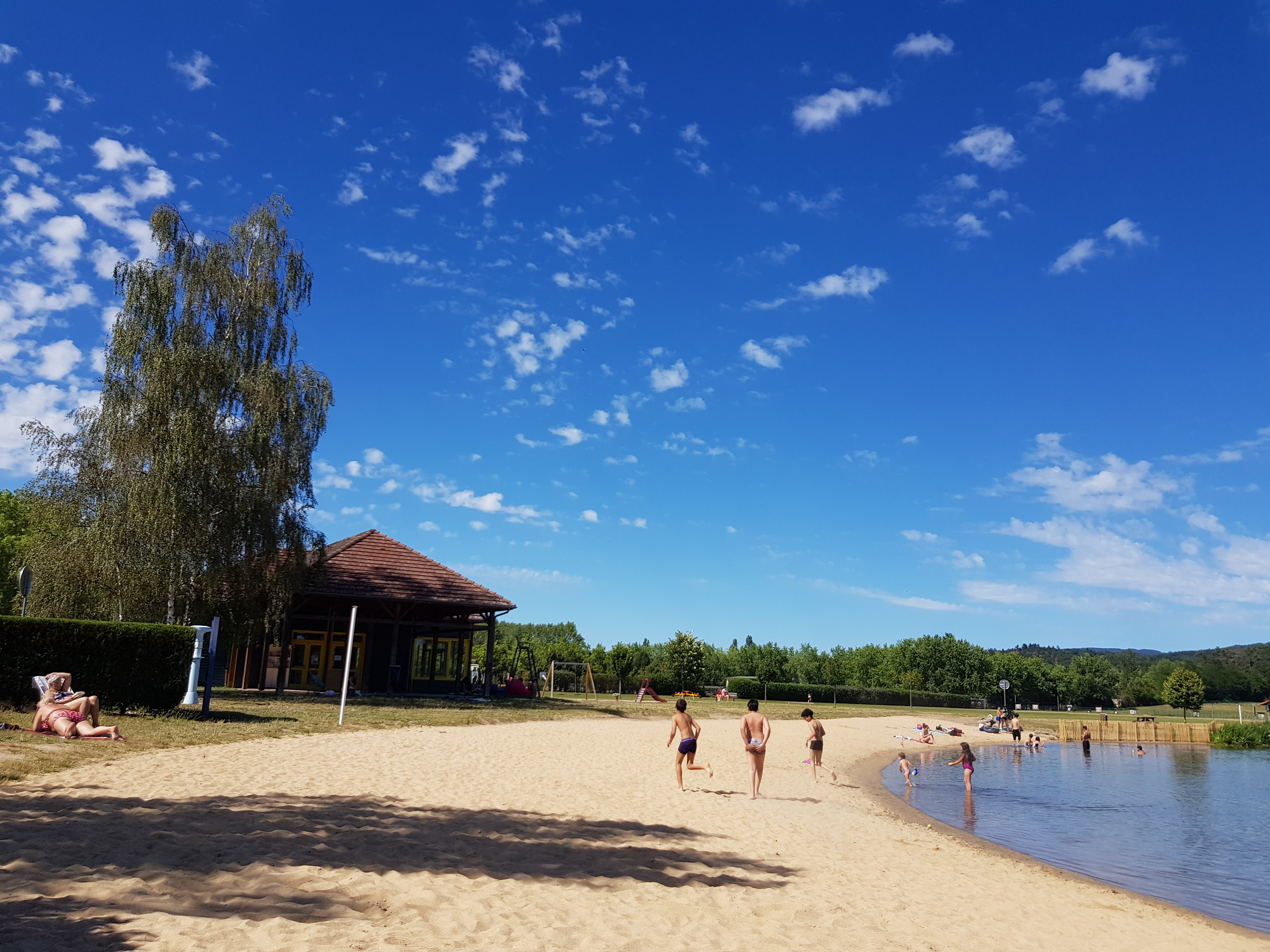

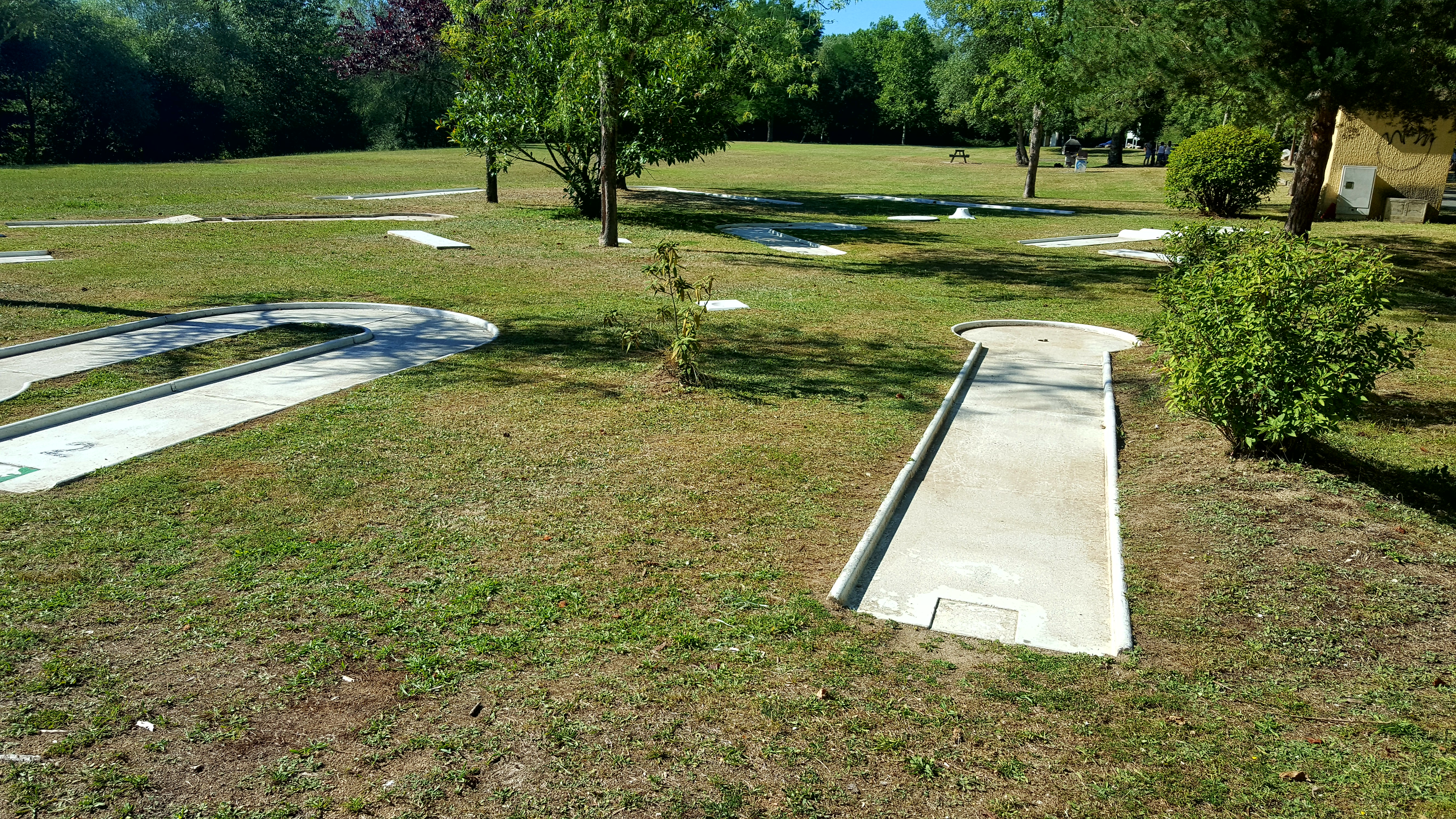

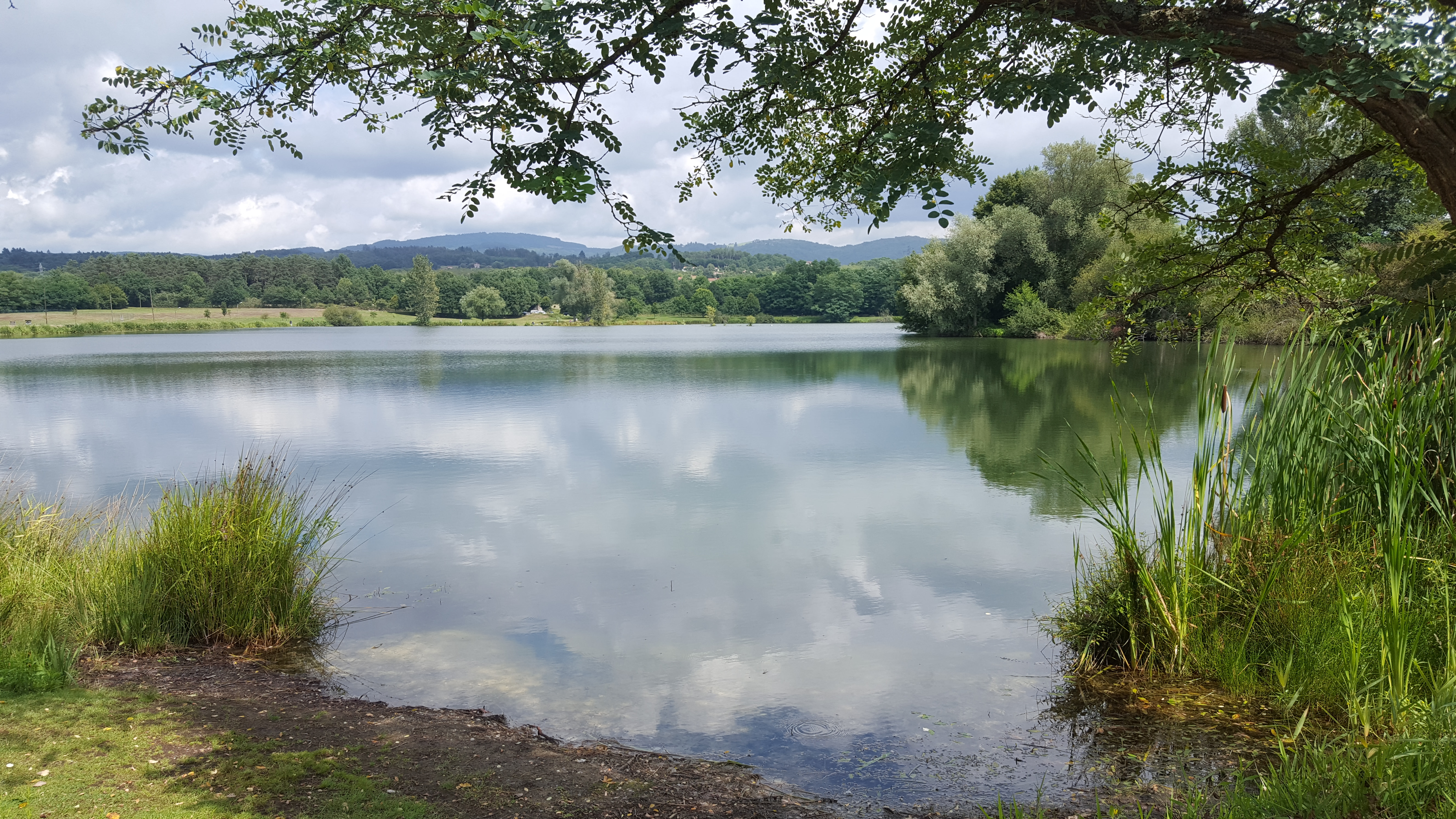
