= Labruyère =

Labruyère may refer to one of several communes in France:

- Labruyère, Côte-d'Or
- Labruyère, Oise
- Labruyère-Dorsa, Haute-Garonne

== See also ==
- La Bruyère (disambiguation)
