= Pierre Brugière =

French priest and Jansenist

Pierre Brugière (3 October 1730 – 7 November 1803) was a French priest and Jansenist, who supported the French Revolution and the reforms it sought to bring to bear on the Catholic Church.

== Biography ==
Brugière was born at Thiers. He was chaplain of the Ursulines and Canon in his home town when his refusal to sign the formula of the acceptation of the Papal Bull Unigenitus forced him to leave. He went to Paris where for twelve years he remained with the community of St. Roch. A strongly Jansenistic book which he wrote, Instructions catholiques sur la dévotion au Sacre-Coeur (Paris, 1777), brought this connection to an end. When the Revolution broke out he welcomed it with enthusiasm. He wrote two books strongly calling for reform: Doléances des églisiers and Relation sommaire et véritable de ce qui s'est passé dans l'Assemblée du clergé (1789).

Brugière gladly took the Constitutional Oath on the day fixed, 9 Jan., 1791, as required by the Civil Constitution of the Clergy. Elected curé of St. Paul's he defended the civil constitution against episcopal and papal censures in his Discours patriotique au sujet des brefs du pape and La lanterne sourde (aimed at François de Bonal, Bishop of Clermont). However, that he condemned the marriage of priests which the Constitution was trying to allow. Against this practice he wrote his Réflexions d'un curé, and Lettre d'un curé (1791), and together with several other constitutionals he denounced its advocates without mercy in Le nouveau disciple de Luther (1792). This brochure was aimed at Aubert, a married priest appointed by Jean-Baptiste-Joseph Gobel curé of St. Augustin.

Brugière's preaching placed him in the hands of the revolutionary tribunal, and it was while he was imprisoned he wrote to his followers the Lettre d'un cure du fond de sa prison à ses paroissiens (1793). Set at liberty, he continued his pastoral ministrations in spite of the charge of treasonable conduct, a dangerous thing in those days. But his ministrations were of a novel kind. Mass was said and the sacraments were administered by him in French, and in support of that singularity an appeal was made to the people, Appel au peuple francais (1798)

Brugière had rebuked the bishops who condemned the oath. He had likewise rebuked the priests who married. Now he was no less violent against the "Jurors" (those who had signed the oath) who began to retract. He attended the two councils of 1797 and 1801 which were trying hard to sustain the faltering Constitutional Church, and he founded a society for its protection: Société de philosophie chrétienne. Even after the promulgation of the Concordat of 1801 he clung to the then dead Constitutional Church. He died in Paris.

== Works ==
Besides the works already mentioned, Brugière wrote a number of pamphlets and left many sermons which were published after his death: Instructions choisies (Paris, 1804). Two contemporaries, the Abbé Massy and the Christian Brother Renaud, wrote his life under the title Mémoire apologétique de Pierre Brugière (Paris, 1804).
