= Marjacq =

The Marjacq knife is a folding knife made at Thiers in France. The blade is of stainless steel and the handle is of boxwood, olive-wood or ebony, and there is a locking-ring to hold the blade in position, similar to that found on Opinel knives.
