= Church of St John, Thiers =

Catholic church in Thiers, France

Church of St Jean, Thiers
- Église Saint-Jean de Thiers
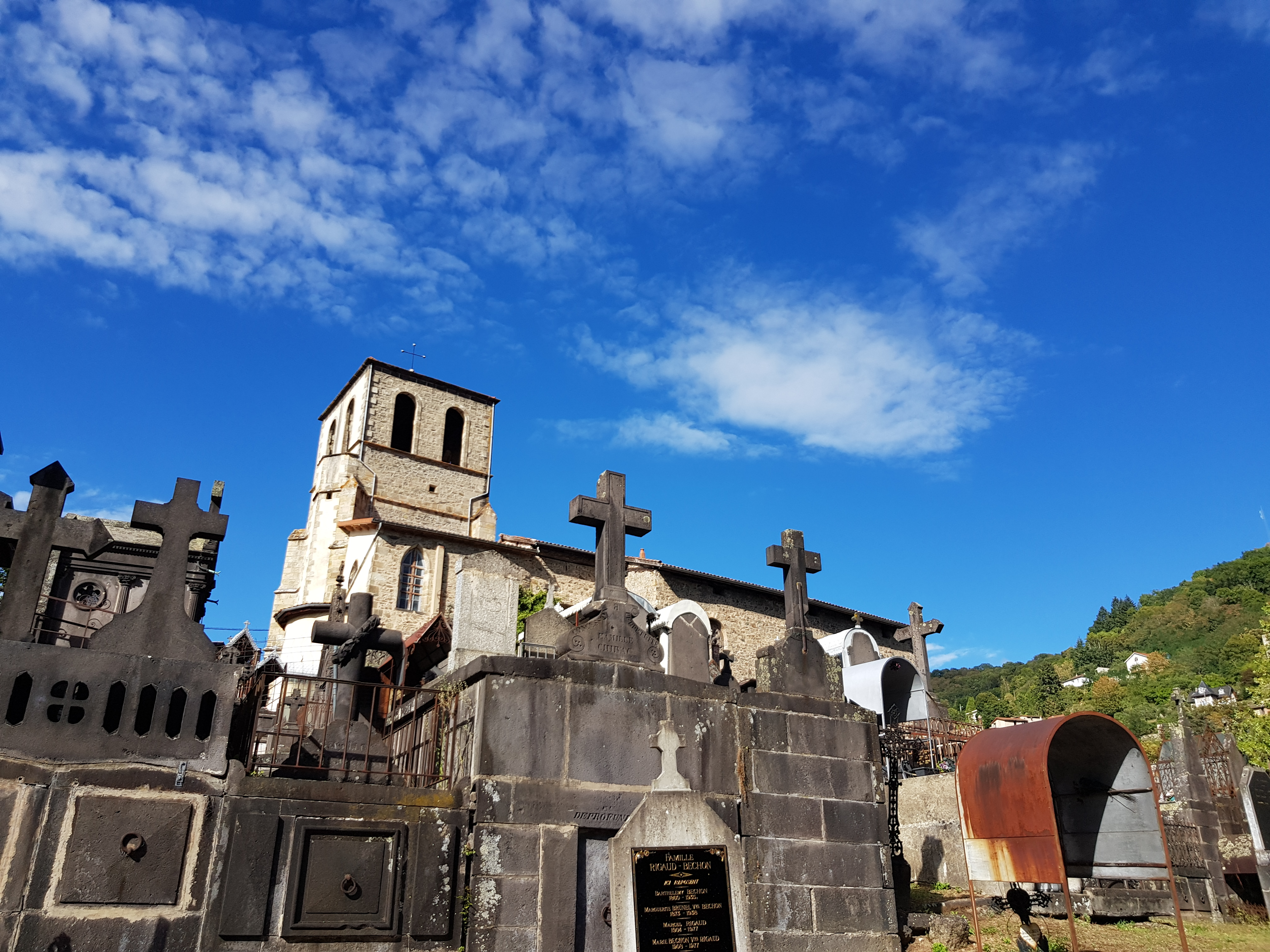
- The church and cemetery of Saint-Jean in August 2020

- Location within France

Religion
- Affiliation: Catholic
- Ownership: City of Thiers
- Status: Open during heritage days

Location
- Location: Thiers, Puy-de-Dôme, Auvergne-Rhône-Alpes
- Country: France
- Interactive map of Church of St Jean, Thiers
- Coordinates: 45°51′01″N 3°32′58″E

Architecture
- Style: Gothic architecture
- Completed: 15th century (current building)

The Church of St John, Thiers (French: Église Saint-Jean de Thiers, Église Saint-Jean du Passet), is a Catholic church located in the lower part of the rocky spur in the city center of Thiers, in the Puy-de-Dôme region of France.

While its exact construction date is unknown, the first references to the structure date back to the 11th century. The church underwent significant renovations in the 15th century and was later incorporated into Thiers' city fortifications in the 16th century.

Renowned as the only church in Thiers primarily composed of Gothic architectural elements, it is also a notable tourist attraction in this medieval town, complemented by its picturesque namesake cemetery.

Listed as a historic monument in 1986, the church was permanently closed to the public that year. However, it reopened in September 2020 for guided tours and temporary exhibitions.

== Location ==
The church is located in the French department of Puy-de-Dôme, in the commune of Thiers. Situated south of the city's medieval center, it is part of the fifth fortified enclosure of the Thiers Ramparts. It overlooks the Vallée des Usines (Valley of Factories) and the surrounding namesake neighborhood from a rocky promontory. The upper part of the church, along with its bell tower, is visible from the lower parts of the city and the Limagne plain.

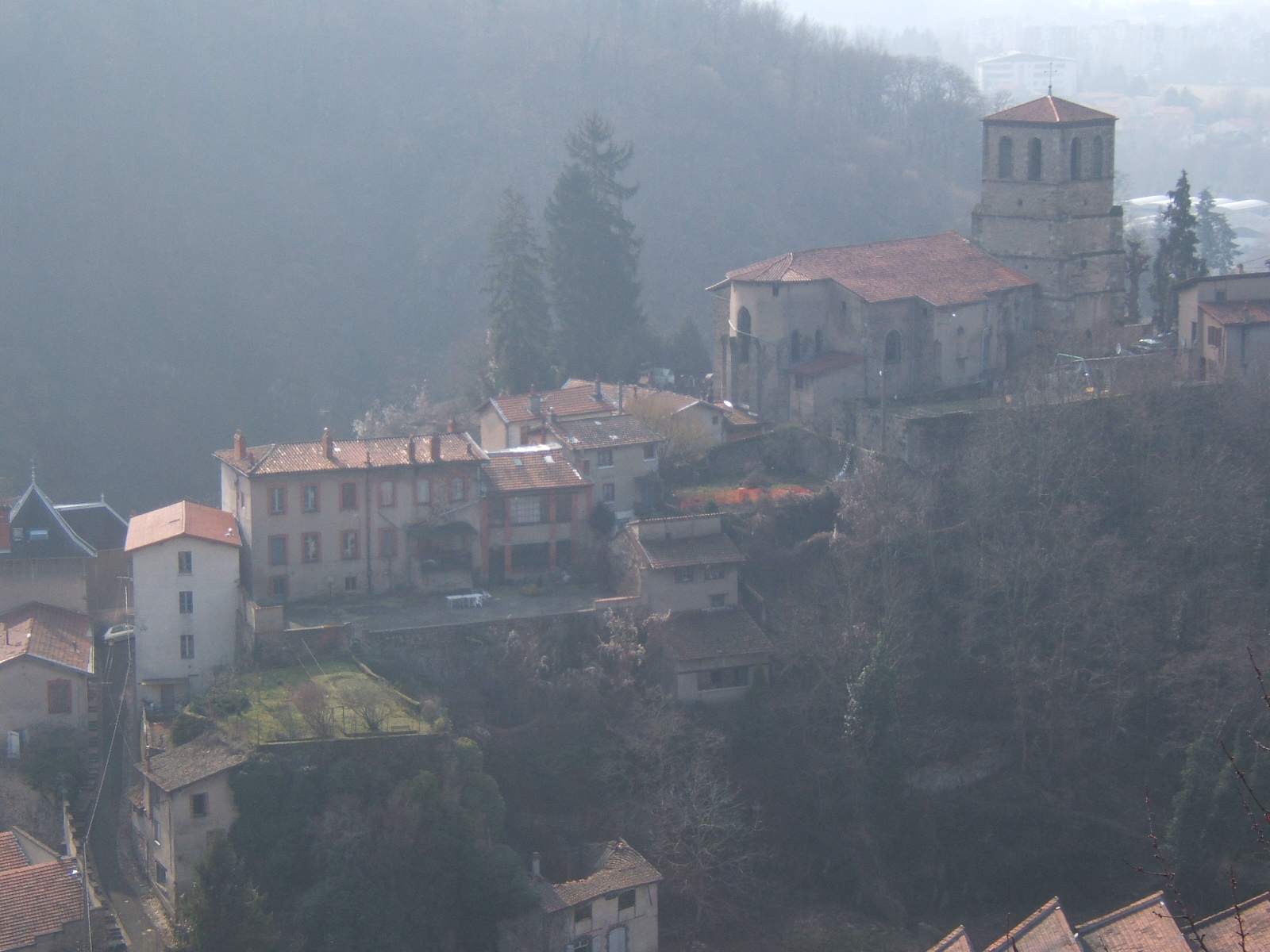
Aerial view of the Saint-Jean district to the south of the medieval town of Thiers.

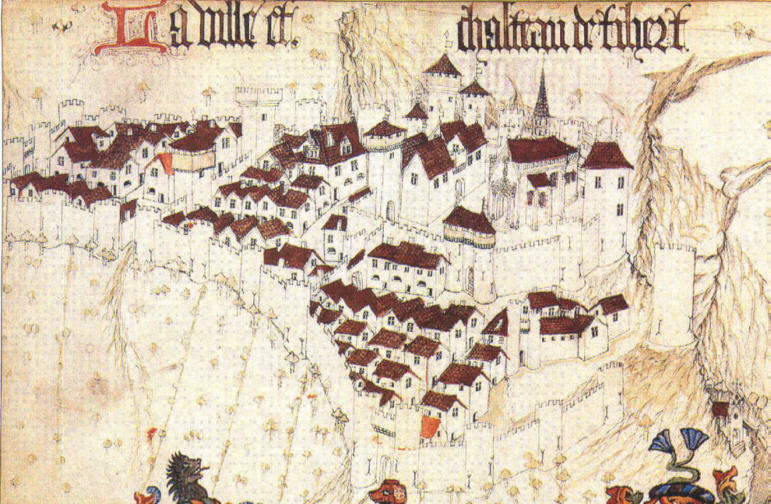
15th-century armorial of Revel, with the church of St John in the lower right-hand corner.

== Toponymy ==
The church is dedicated to Saint John the Baptist, which is reflected in its name. The addition of "Passet" derives from the root "pas", meaning a narrow passage or difficult crossing in a valley, referencing the church's geographic location on a promontory overlooking the Vallée des Usines. The church lends its name to the surrounding neighborhood and cemetery, as well as to an old fortified gate of which it was once a part.

== History ==
=== Origin ===
The church stands at the center of the second urban nucleus of the upper town, established in the 11th century, with the first nucleus being the fortified castle and the church of Saint-Genès. The exact date of the church's foundation remains unknown. The oldest traces of the building are Romanesque in origin. When the fourth fortification enclosure was constructed at the end of the 14th century, the suburb now known as the Saint-Jean district was integrated into the rest of the upper town, though the church itself remained outside the fortified walls.

During the Wars of Religion, the church was incorporated into the city walls and became a fortified church, also serving as a gate for entering the southern part of the city.

=== Earlier structure ===
The earliest references to the church date back to the 12th century. Some parts of the current structure also originate from this period. For instance, a small Romanesque vault is recorded on the west side of the nave, to the north of the first bay.

=== Current structure ===
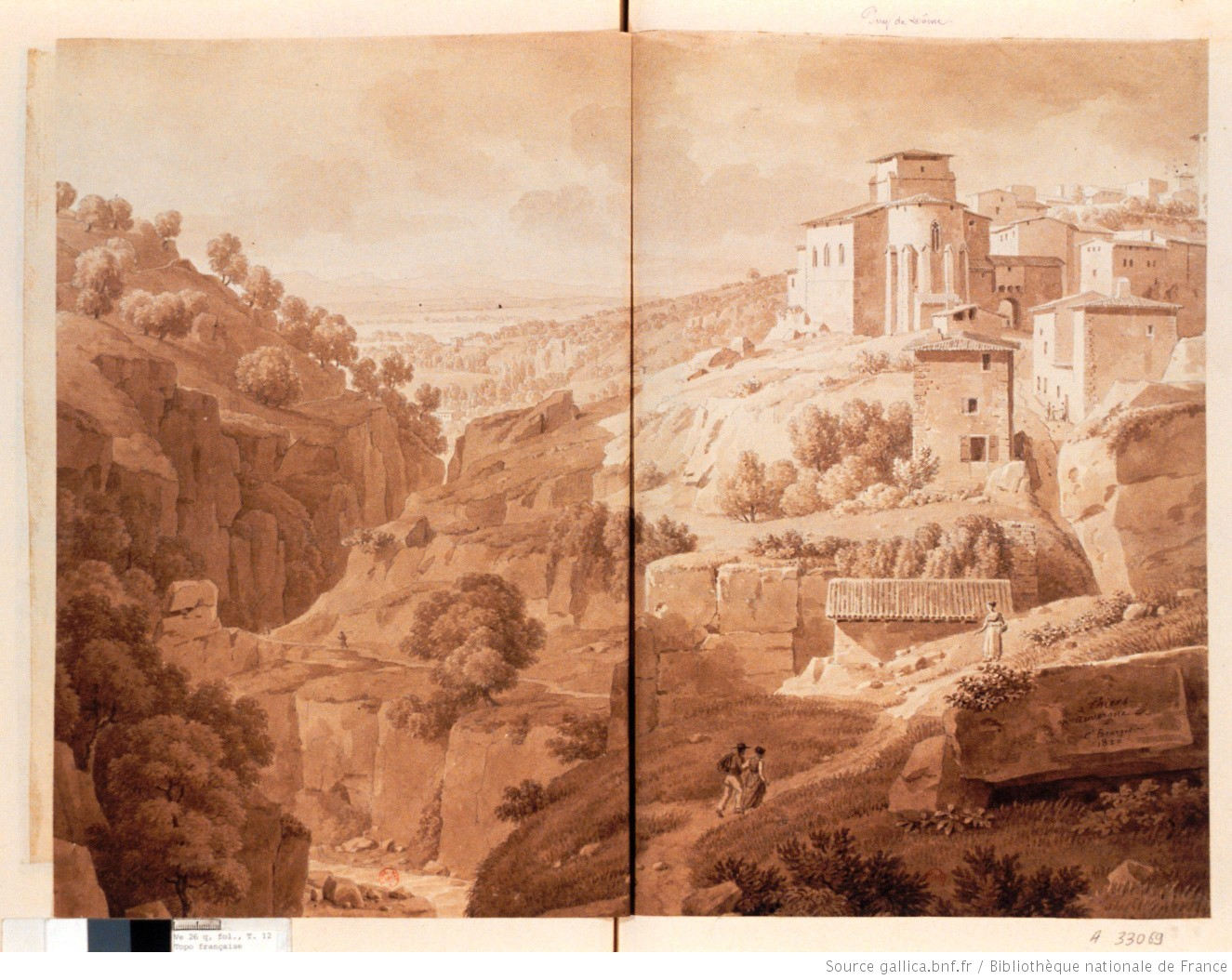
The church and Saint-Jean gate in the 18th century

The church underwent significant transformations in the 15th century, adopting a Flamboyant Gothic architecture and style. It became the only church in Thiers predominantly composed of Gothic elements, as the churches of Saint-Symphorien du Moûtier and Saint-Genès are primarily Romanesque.

In the Armorial de Revel, a mid-15th-century depiction shows the church with a single nave and a porch. The porch is preceded by a few steps and topped with a bell gable featuring three bays and a cross at its peak.

The church quickly became a place of worship for the industrial population, as the nearby Durolle gorges hosted numerous grinding mills and factories.

In the 17th century, following the establishment of the White Penitents of "the Most August Blessed Sacrament of the Altar" in 1622, the western part of the church was modified to suit the needs of the confraternity. This included the addition of a sacristy, a deliberation room, and a gallery.

By the late 18th century, the bell tower's underground area was converted into an ossuary to house bones transferred from the burial ground of Saint-Genès, which had been decommissioned.

Extensive renovations were carried out in the 19th century, including the restoration of the sacristy in the northeast, repairs to the gallery and its access staircase, the opening of a new entrance portal at the base of the bell tower, and repairs to the tower itself.

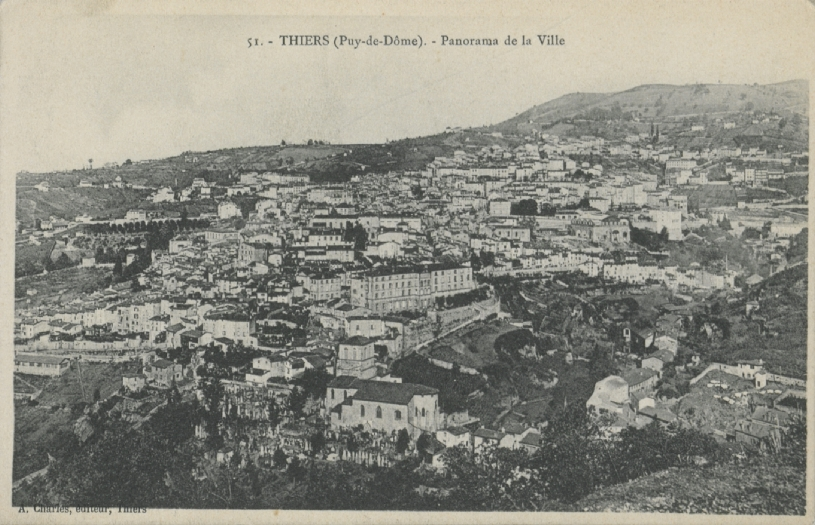
General panorama of the town of Thiers, with the church and burial ground of Saint-Jean in the foreground.

=== Listing ===
The church was added to the list of historical monuments on October 27, 1986, following its permanent closure to the public by a prefectural decree. The church is also protected under the safeguarded sector of Thiers, which includes the medieval center of the commune and part of the Vallée des Usines.

=== Closure ===
Significant structural issues began appearing as early as the 1970s, particularly in the southern aisle. Despite this, the church remained open for ceremonies involving residents of the neighborhood during the 1980s. Props were installed to support the vaults, which showed damage caused by cracks resulting from the southern façade's partial subsidence. The church was permanently closed to worship and all activities in October 1986.

Since then, it has become, along with its cemetery, a minor tourist site in the city of Thiers.

=== Reopening ===
In early September 2020, the new municipal government of Thiers announced the church's exceptional reopening for the European Heritage Days on September 19 and 20. Despite acknowledging its condition, the city had the building inspected by two architects who approved its reopening for guided tours.

In a challenging health context, the church welcomed 535 visitors for fully booked guided tours during the weekend of September 19 and 20, 2020. To highlight the Saint-Jean district, its cemetery, and the church itself, the municipality worked closely with the Creux de l'Enfer contemporary art center located in the nearby Vallée des Usines. In collaboration with the Thiers Dore et Montagne community of communes, the church was reopened for the 2021 summer season to host a public exhibition.

== Architecture ==
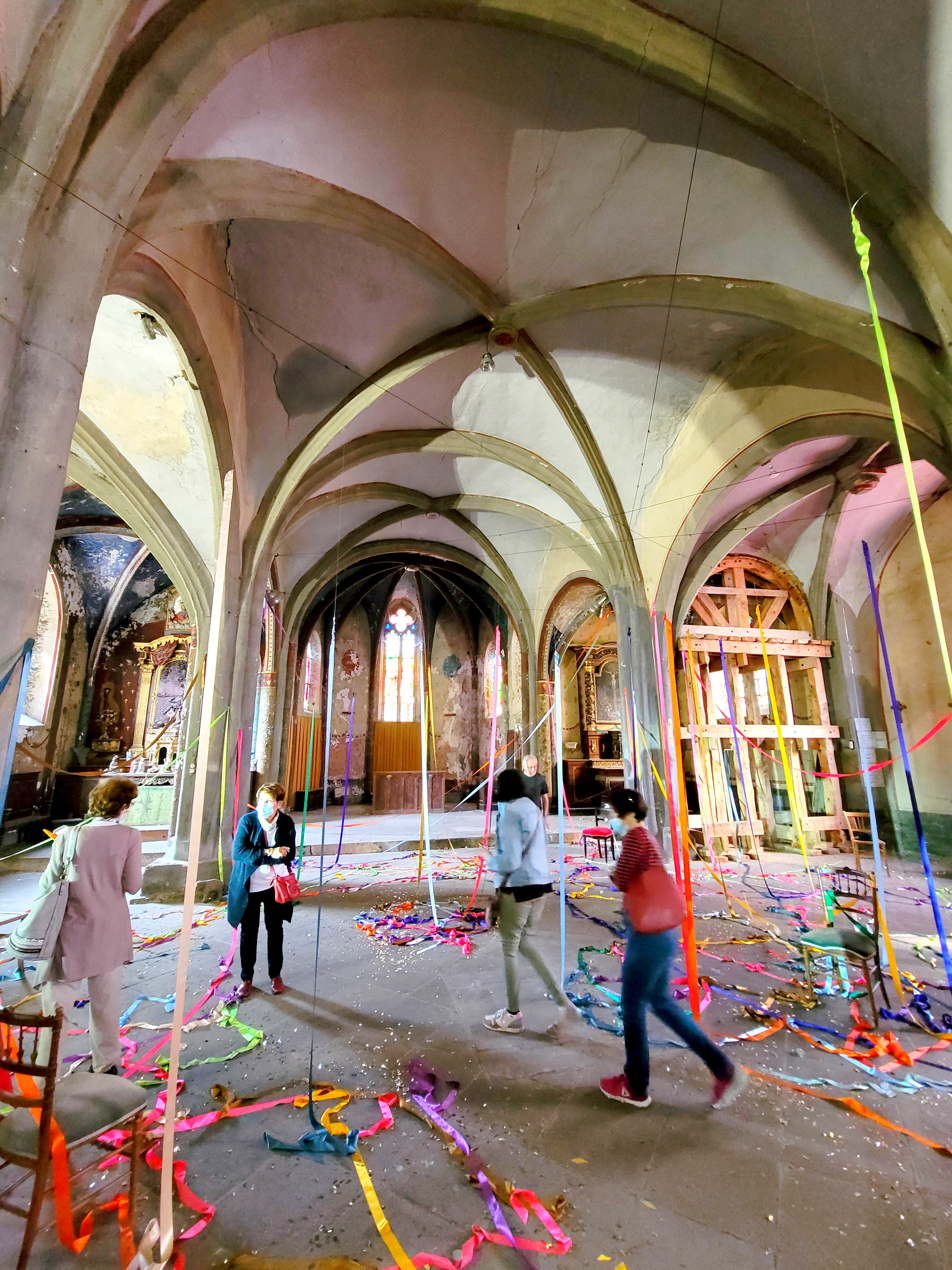
Interior of the church during an exhibition in 2021

In the 16th century, during the Wars of Religion, the church was incorporated into the defensive system of the town's outermost fortifications. Significant alterations were made to the building during this period. Occasionally, it served as a redoubt for soldiers who positioned themselves above the vaults, behind spaced battlements that remain visible today.

=== Interior design ===
The building consists of a central nave with four irregular bays, flanked by two aisles: the northern aisle has four bays, while the southern has only three. The polygonal choir is preceded by a straight bay. The entire structure is rib-vaulted, except for the first bay of the northern aisle, which features Romanesque groin vaulting as a remnant of the church's earliest phase. The third bay of the northern aisle creates a slight exterior projection. The stained-glass windows date back to the 1890s.

=== Exterior decoration ===
As the church was integrated into the city walls and adjoined by the Saint-Jean gate, it became a fortified church. The remains of an arrow slit visible on the former sacristy to the northeast likely date to the mid-16th-century renovations. The massive bell tower, supported by stepped buttresses, appears to have been incorporated into the city's defensive system.

The bell tower, located at the northwest corner of the building, is accessed via a semi-engaged spiral staircase housed in a polygonal turret. The gallery, situated at the west end of the central nave, is reached by a semi-circular, semi-engaged turning staircase with no windows.

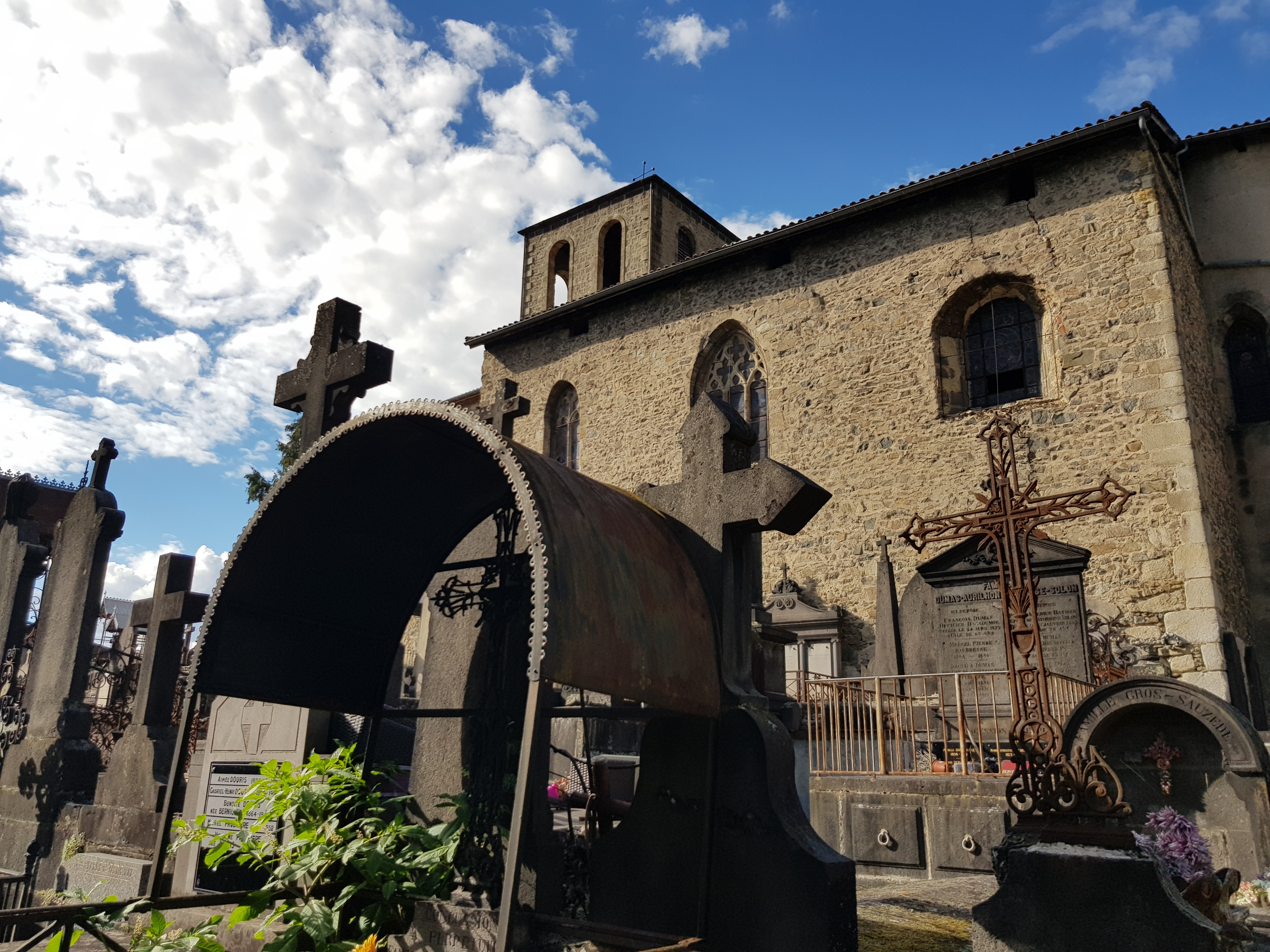
South side of the church from the cemetery

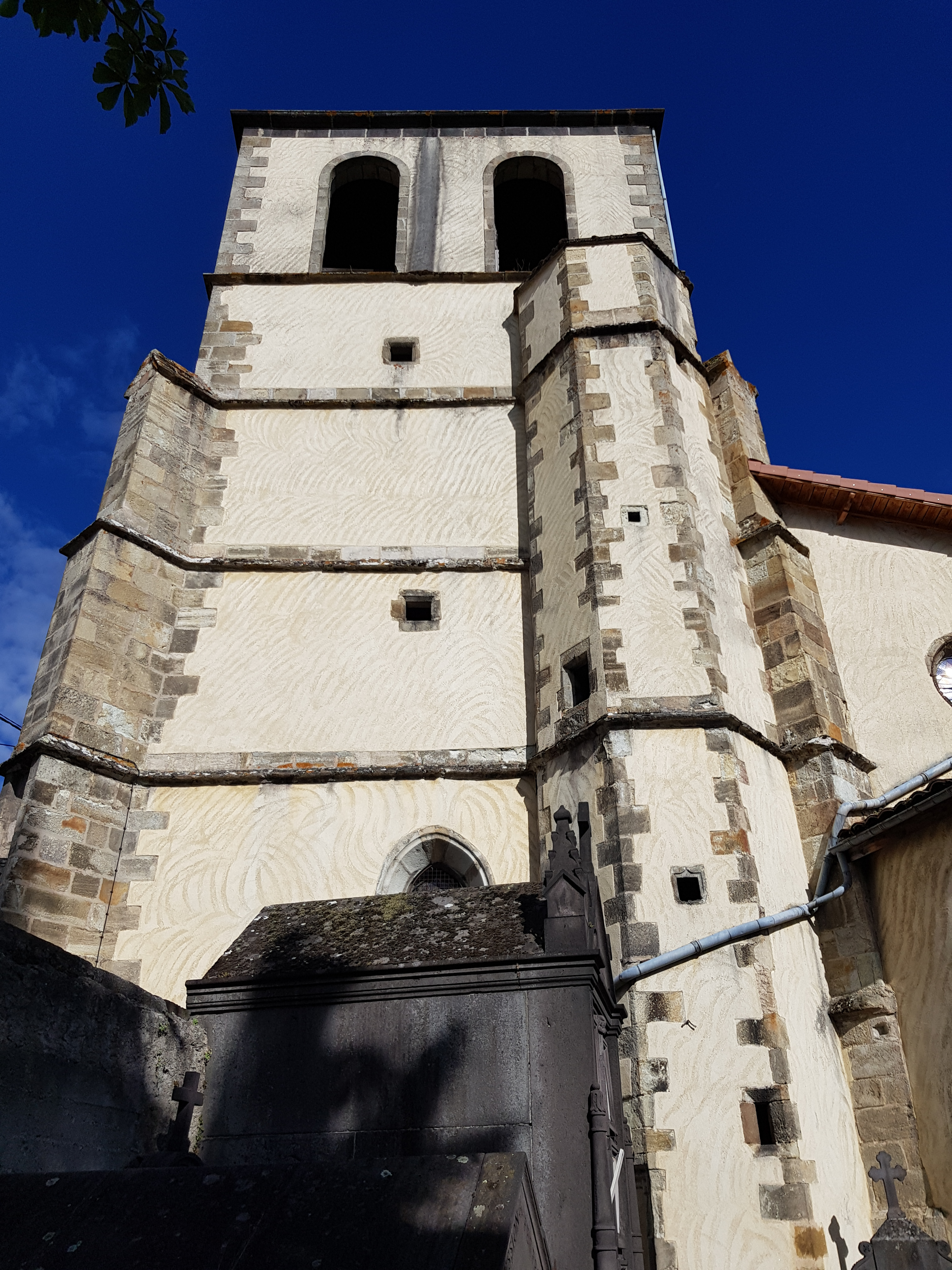
Church tower, west side

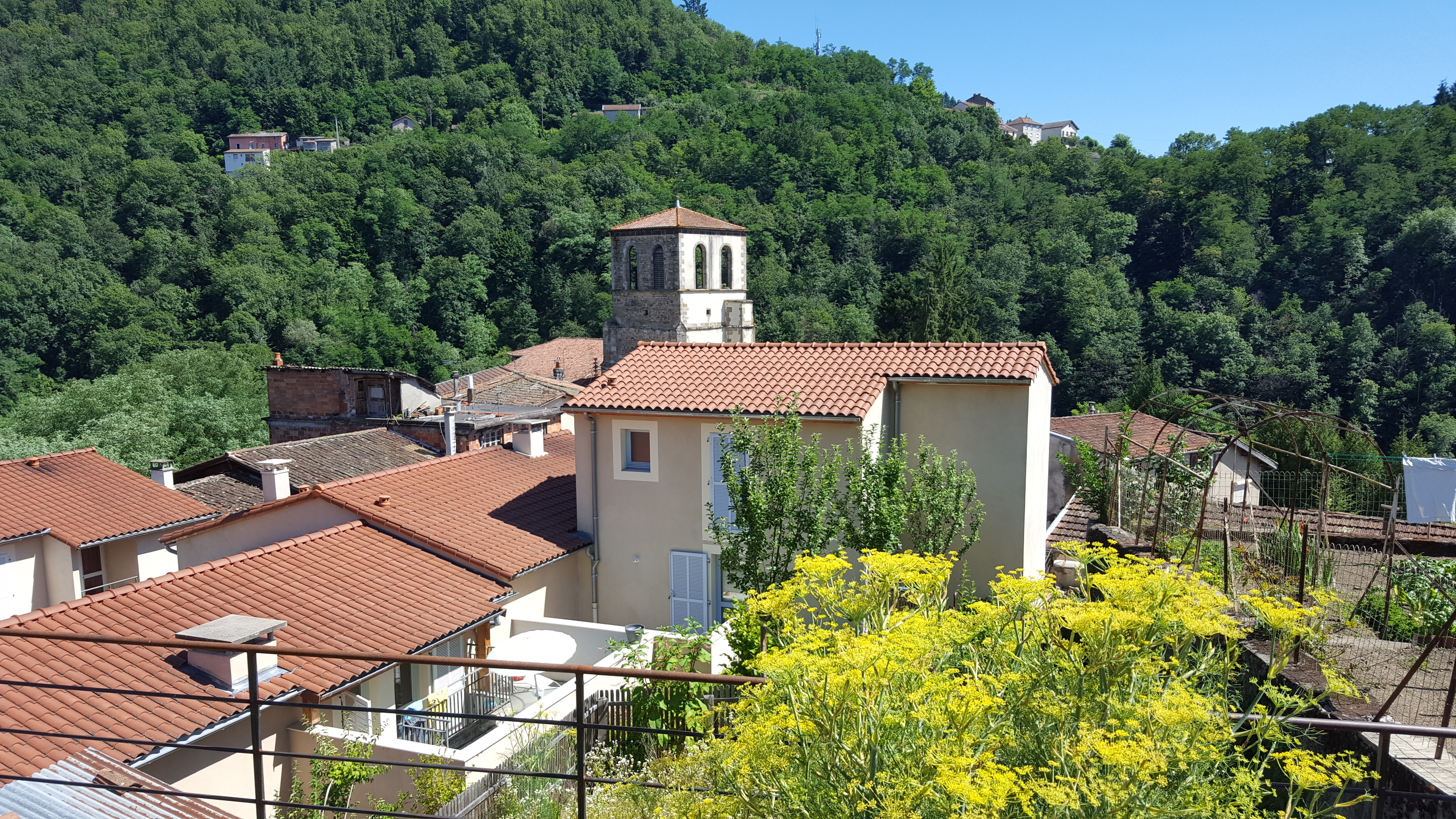
The bell tower from the Saint-Jean district.

==== Materials and construction ====
A variety of materials were used in the church's masonry, including granite, arkose, and lava stone, employing several construction techniques that are partially visible in the current building. The oldest sections, such as some wall remnants in the attic, are made of cut stone. In contrast, the 15th- and 19th-century masonry consists of rubble stone, coated with plaster on the church's western façade, the chevet, and parts of the northern side.

==== Roofing ====
The nave and aisles are covered with long-pitched roofs, while the bell tower features a pavilion roof. The polygonal apse of the choir and the lean-to roof of the sacristy are topped with curved tiles.

=== Crypt and underground structures ===
The crypt of the church was filled with earth brought from the old cemetery of Moûtier. At the end of the 18th century, following the closure of the Saint-Genès burial ground, the underground chambers of the bell tower were converted into an ossuary.

== The cemetery ==
St John's cemetery
- Cimetière Saint-Jean de Thiers
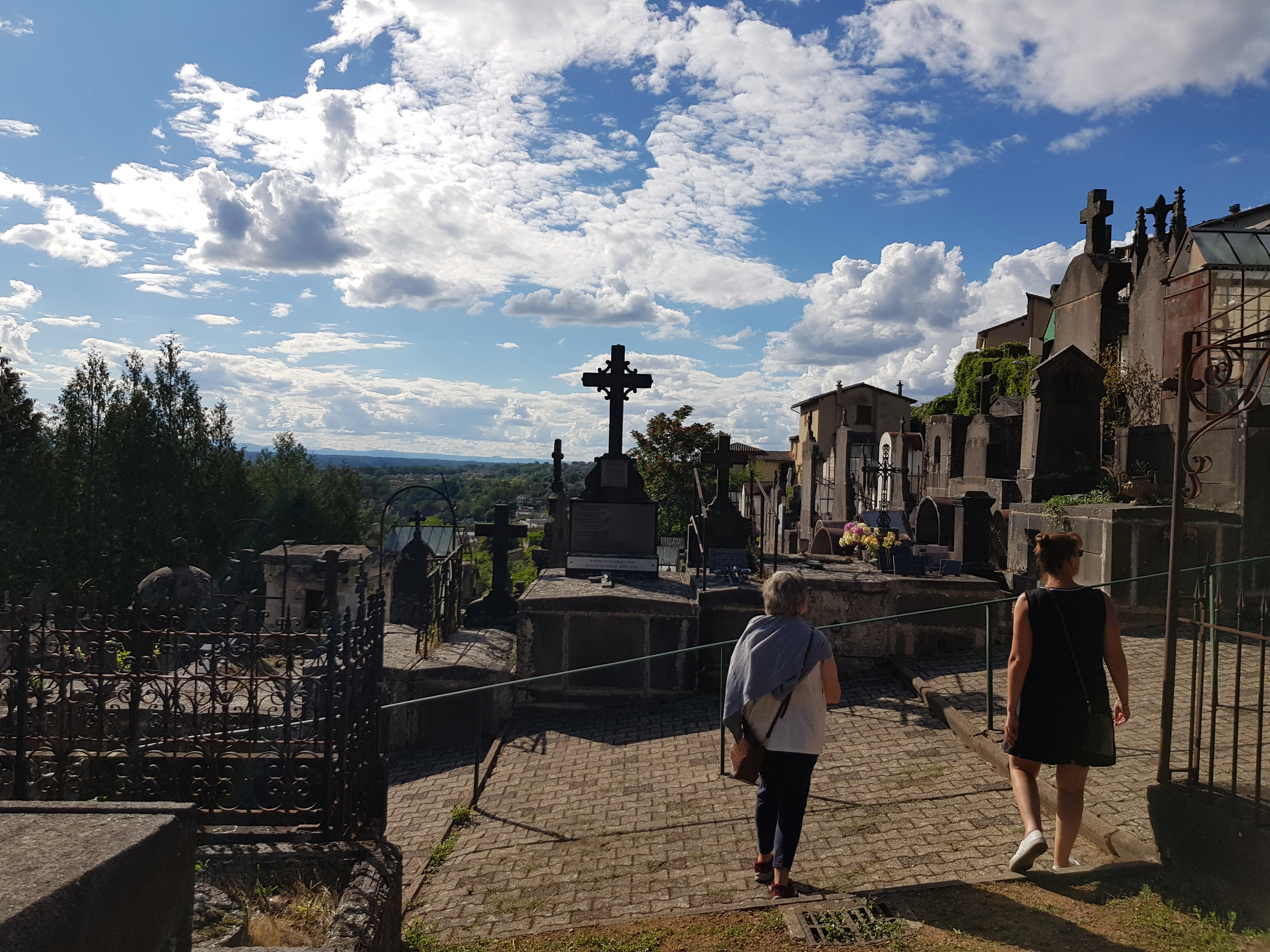
- Central pathway of the cemetery, August 2020.
- Interactive map of St John's cemetery

Details
- Location: Place Saint-Jean, 63300 Thiers
- Country: France
- Coordinates: 45°51′04″N 3°32′58″E
- Size: 0.6 hectares
- No. of graves: 600

=== History ===
The 18th-century cadastral map already shows a parish burial ground surrounding the church, located outside the city's walls. The Romanesque remnants of the church confirm that it was built before the 15th century, and the burial ground dates back to the same period.

The 1804 decree requiring burial grounds to be relocated outside city boundaries led to the transfer of burials from the graveyard of Saint-Genès to that of Saint-Jean in 1822. By 1831, the city took over the management of the burial ground, prompting two expansions: the first in 1839 and the second in 1853. The latter involved significant retaining wall construction to stabilize the cemetery's terrain.

In 1876, two years before the inauguration of the Limandons Cemetery, located a few hundred meters away, the burial ground of Saint-Jean was once again reserved exclusively for parishioners of the church of St John. New improvements were made, including the creation of four additional rows of plots to the south, east, and west.

=== Description ===
The burial ground is located at the edge of a promontory overlooking the Durolle gorges. It features a somewhat irregular collection of over 700 graves, primarily arranged on terraces oriented east-west, divided by a central path that follows the natural slope. The lower section is less structured, consisting of an open area without clearly defined pathways.

The burial ground extends from the Place Saint-Jean to the north — featuring a lava stone entrance gate previously framed on the interior side by two chestnut trees — to the rocky outcroppings above the river to the south. Like the high-town residential architecture, the graves adapt to the slope: those placed perpendicular to the central path are tiered like a staircase, each grave overlooking the one below.

The layout of the slope reflects a hierarchy in the significance of the tombs. Graves in the upper part, set along well-defined rows on the terraces, are typically more imposing monuments, often constructed from andesite. By contrast, the lower terrace contains most of the simpler graves, many of which are earthen and protected only by curved sheet metal coverings.

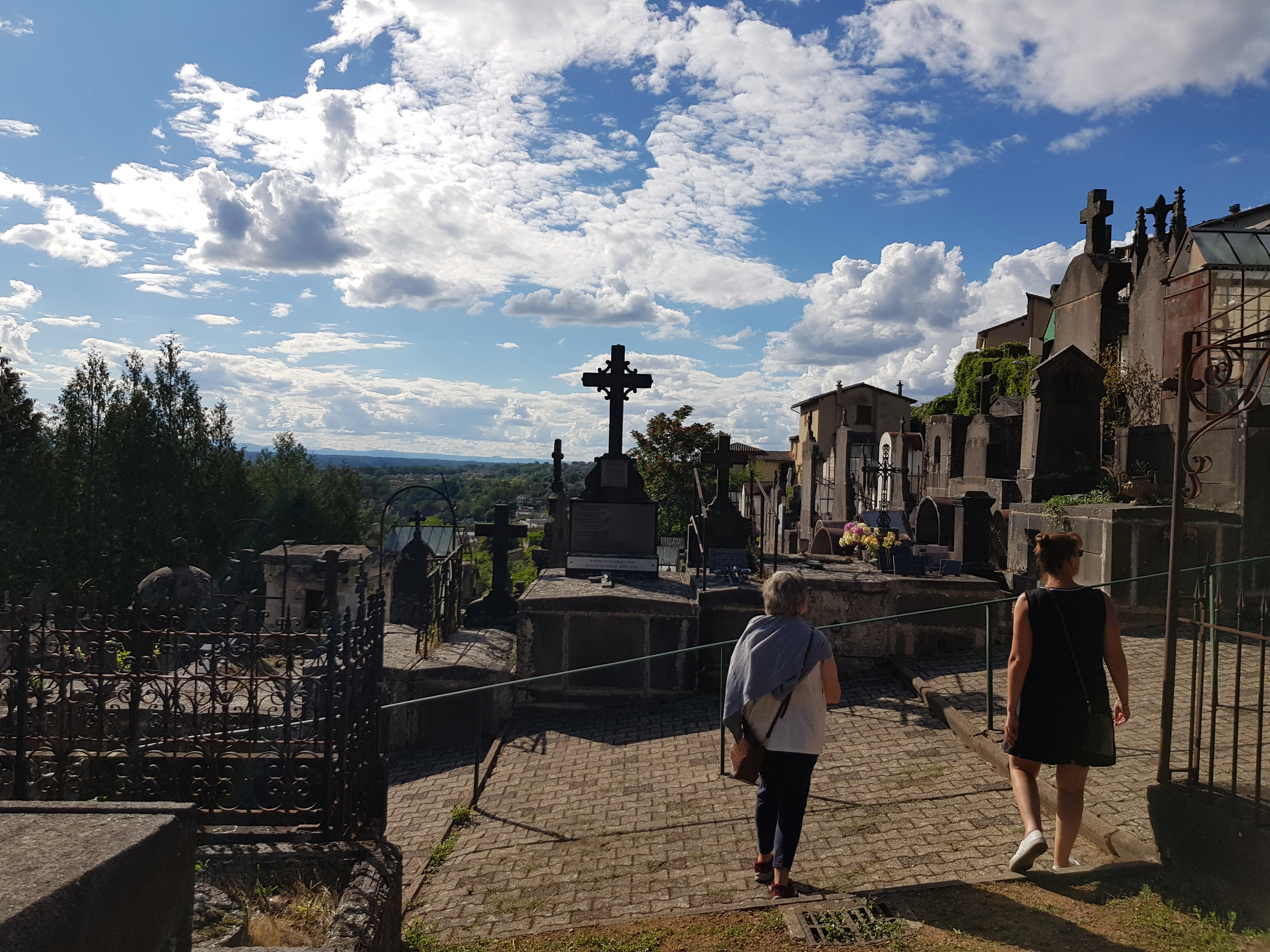
Central alley of the cemetery, side view.

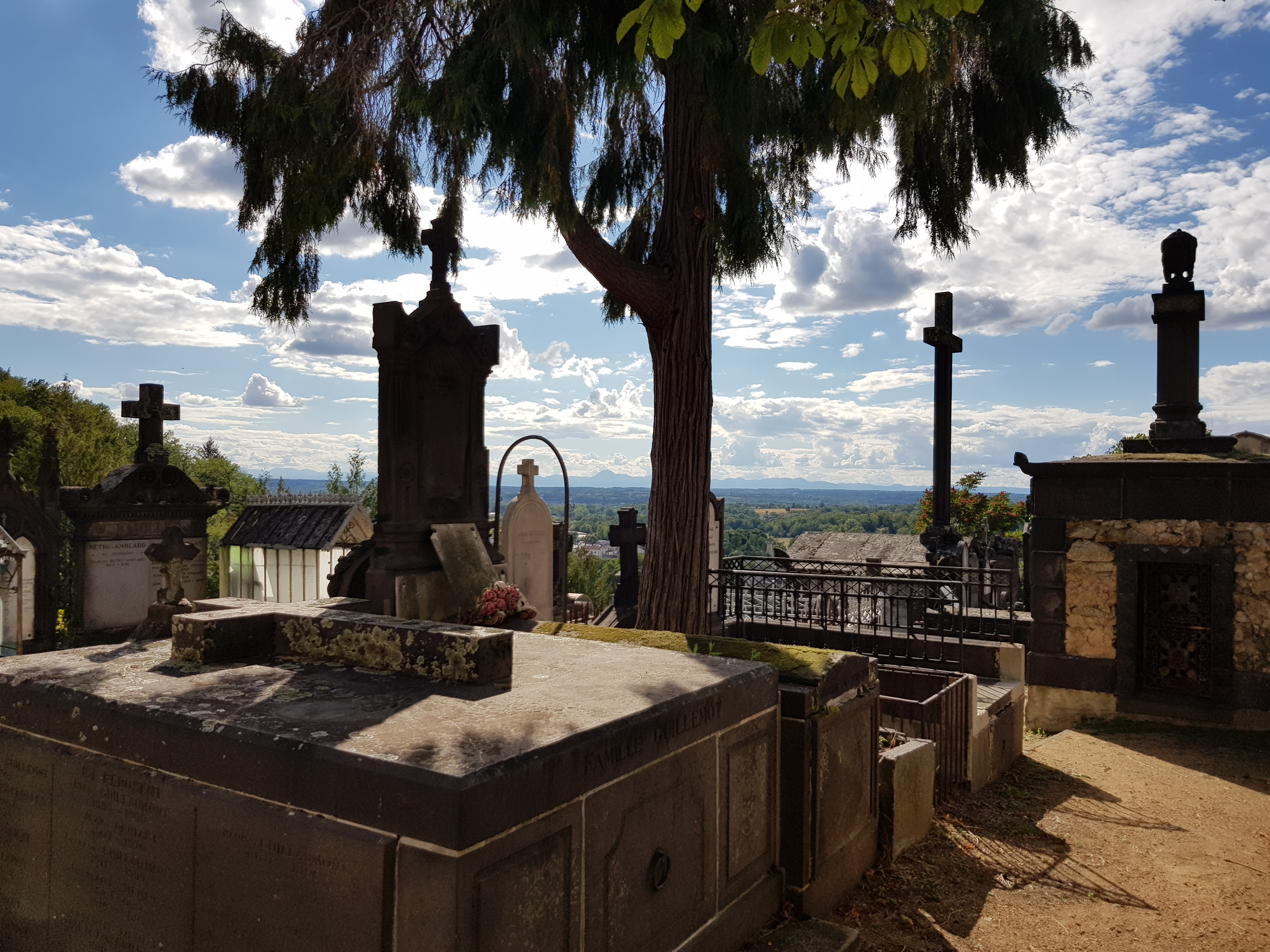
View of the Chaîne des Puys from the cemetery.

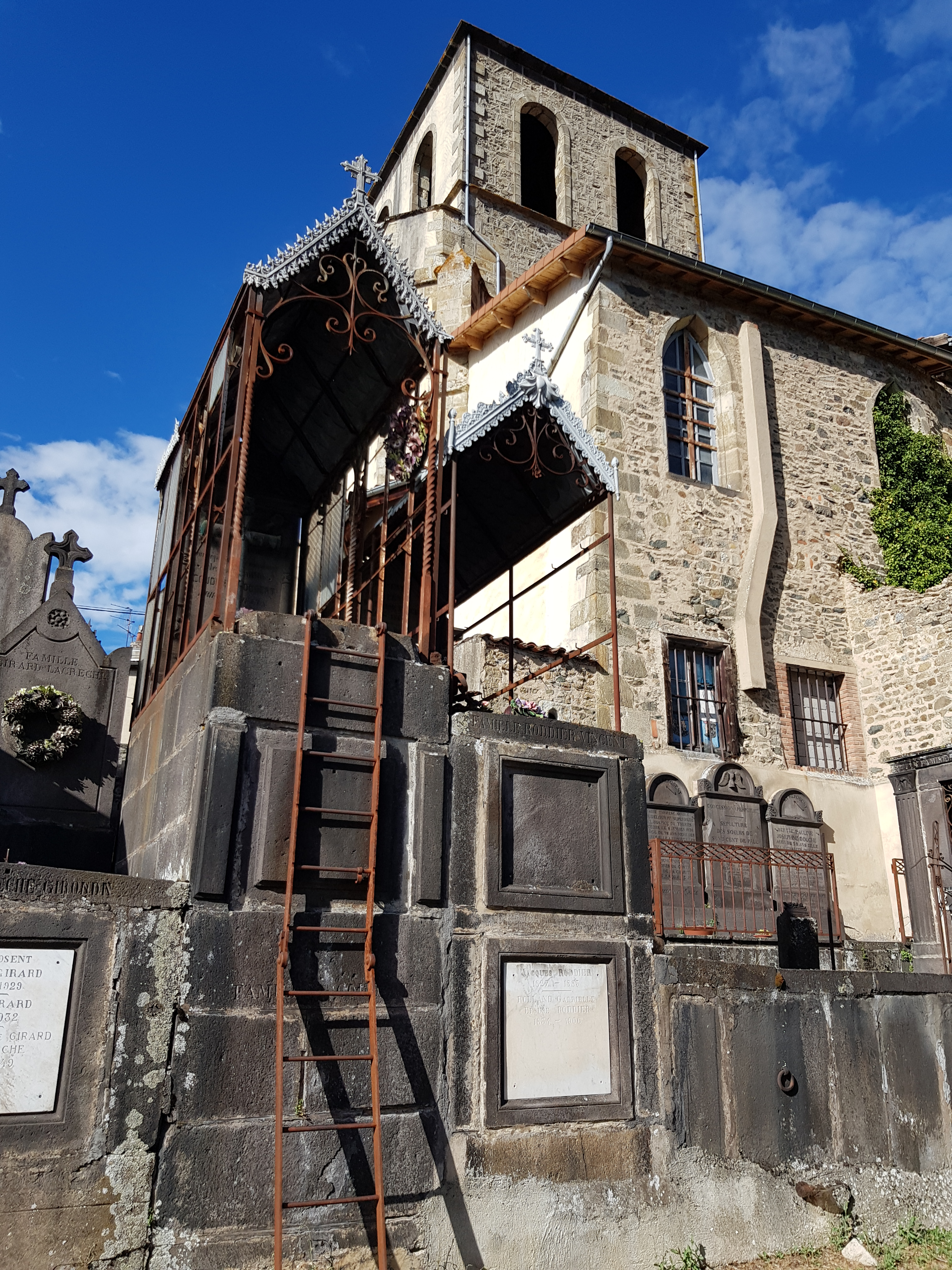
A grave with a ladder to climb on.
