= Brugère =

Brugère is a surname. Notable people with the surname include:

- Fabienne Brugère (born in 1964), French philosopher, academic
- Joseph Brugère (1841–1918), French general
- Louis-Frédéric Brugère (1823–1888), Roman Catholic professor of apologetics and church history
- Raymond Brugère (1885–1966), French diplomat

== See also ==
- Bruyère (disambiguation)
