= Thiers, Puy-de-Dôme =

Thiers Tièrn
- Subprefecture and commune
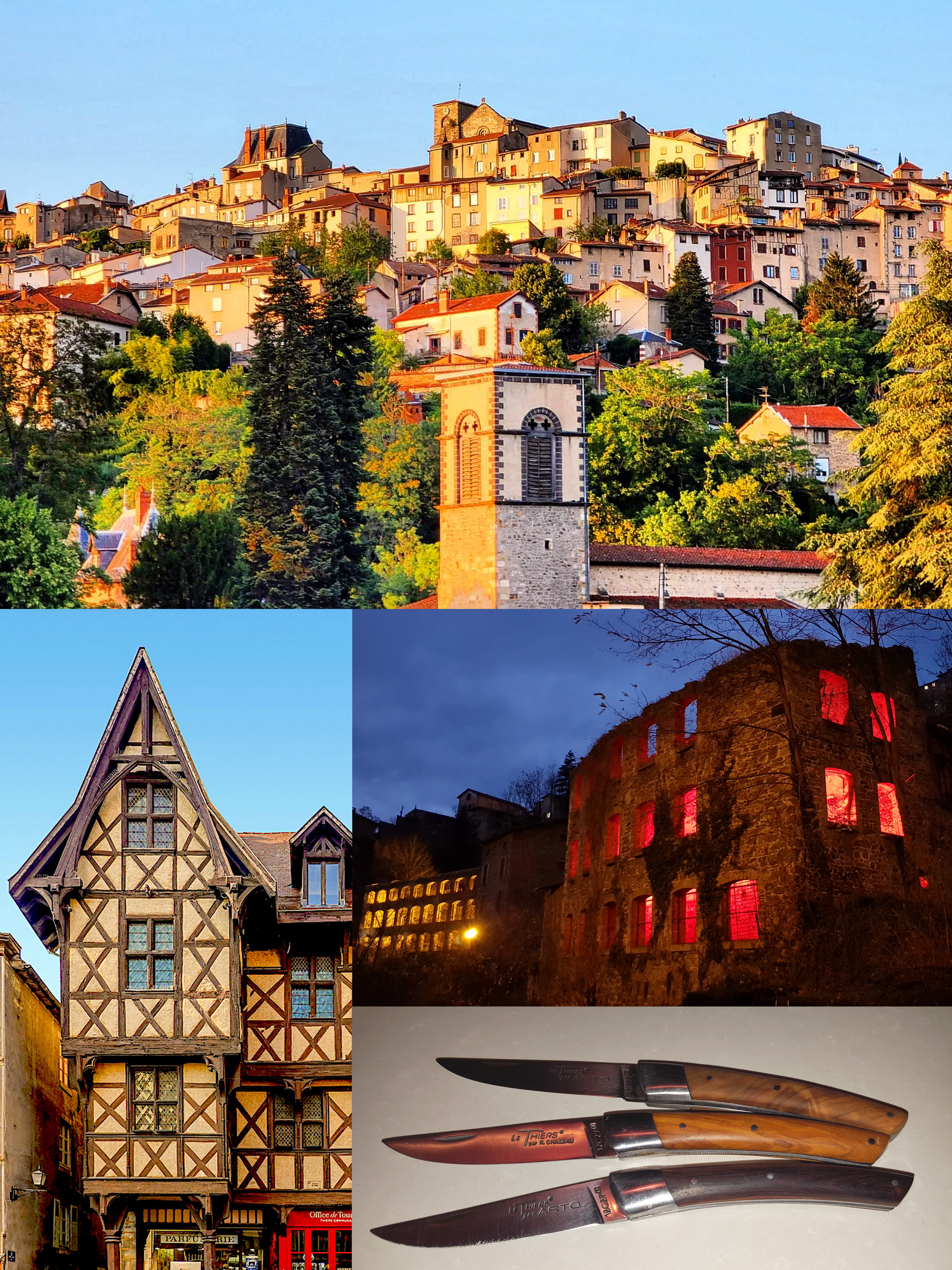
- Thiers city presentation. Above, the medieval city. Bottom left, the Château du Pirou. Bottom right, the Valley of the Factories near the Creux de l'enfer and the Le Thiers knives.

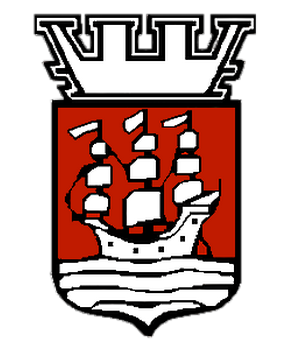
- Flag
- Location of Thiers
- Location within France Location within Auvergne-Rhône-Alpes
- Coordinates: 45°51′26″N 3°32′54″E
- Country: France
- Region: Auvergne-Rhône-Alpes
- Department: Puy-de-Dôme
- Arrondissement: Thiers
- Canton: Thiers
- Intercommunality: Thiers Dore et Montagne

Government
  - Mayor (2026–32): Francis Roux
- Area^{1}: 44.49 km^{2} (17.18 sq mi)
- Elevation: 450 m (1,480 ft)
- Highest elevation: 793 m (2,602 ft)
- Lowest elevation: 2–83 m (6.6–272.3 ft)
- Population (2023): 11,637
  - Density: 261.6/km^{2} (677.4/sq mi)
- Time zone: UTC+01:00 (CET)
  - Summer (DST): UTC+02:00 (CEST)
- INSEE/Postal code: 63430 /63300
- Website: http://www.ville-thiers.fr/
- ^{1} French Land Register data, which excludes lakes, ponds, glaciers > 1 km^{2} (0.386 sq mi or 247 acres) and river estuaries.

Thiers (French pronunciation: [tjɛːʁ]; Auvergnat: Tièrn) is a commune in the Puy-de-Dôme department of Auvergne in central France. With Ambert, Issoire and Riom, it is one of the department's four sub-prefectures. The district of Thiers consists of forty-three municipalities in six cantons. Its inhabitants are known as Thiernois or Bitords.

Thiers is a major historical centre of knife manufacturing, with about one hundred companies and a cutlery museum; seventy percent of French pocketknives, kitchen and table knives are manufactured in Thiers. The knowledge and craft of the Thiernois cutlers are over seven centuries old, and many of the old watermills that were used to manufacture Thiernois knives can still be seen in the Vallée des Rouets.

The city extends over 7 kilometres (4 1/4 miles) on a rocky spur overhanging the nearby mountains and the villages. It is divided into two sections: the lower city (home to many hypermarkets) and the upper, medieval city.

== Overview ==
=== Neighborhoods ===
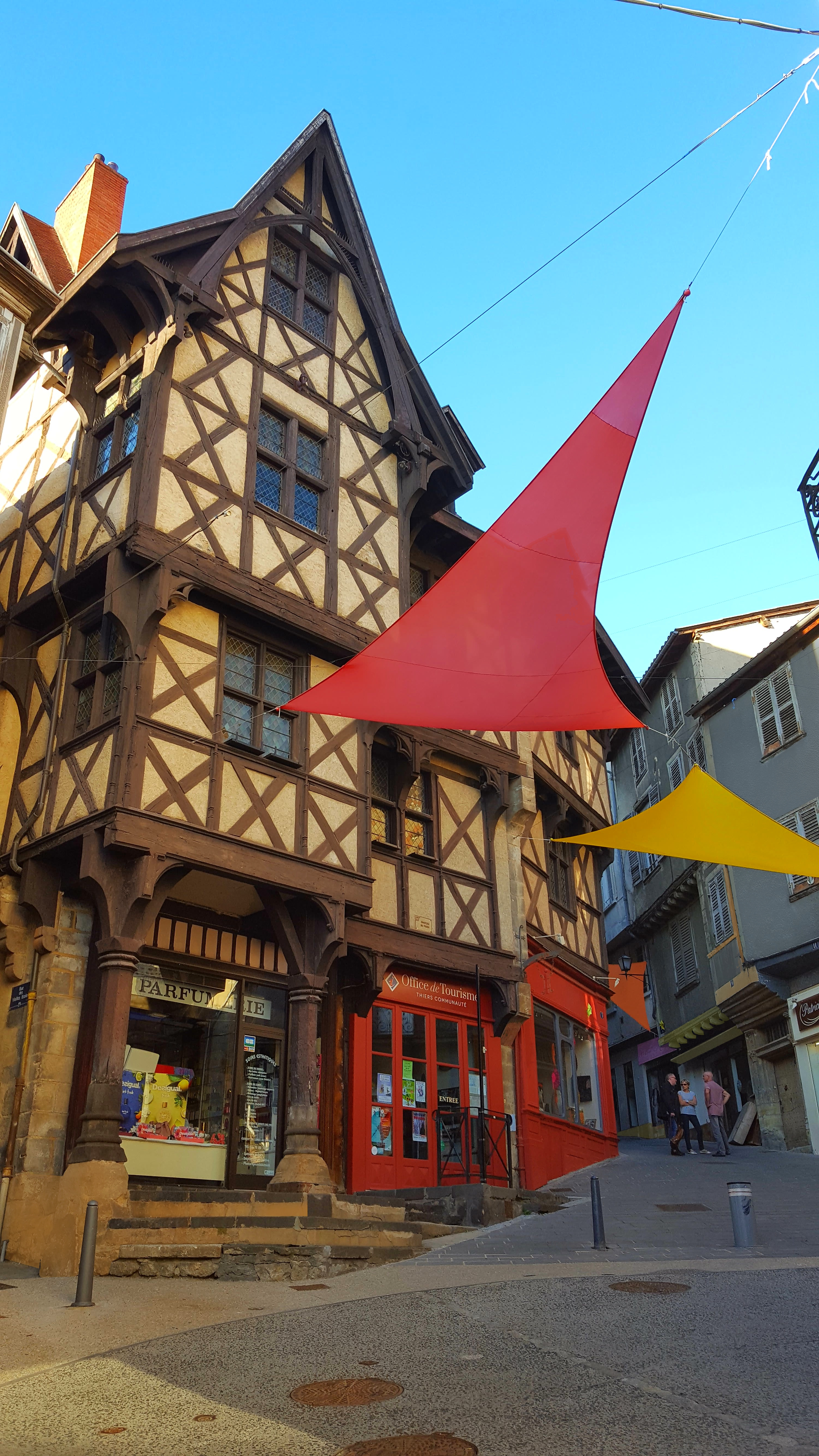
The 15th-century Hôtel du Pirou

Thiers is on the steep hills overlooking the Durolle Valley, and the gradient provides hydropower for grinding mills. The city is divided into a number of neighborhoods. The upper town includes the medieval center, Boulay, the Pontel and the Jaiffours. Much of the city's history took place in its hills.

The lower city began to be developed during the 1950s. Thiers is known as a city of hypermarkets and supermarkets, and the lower city primarily consists of businesses and services.

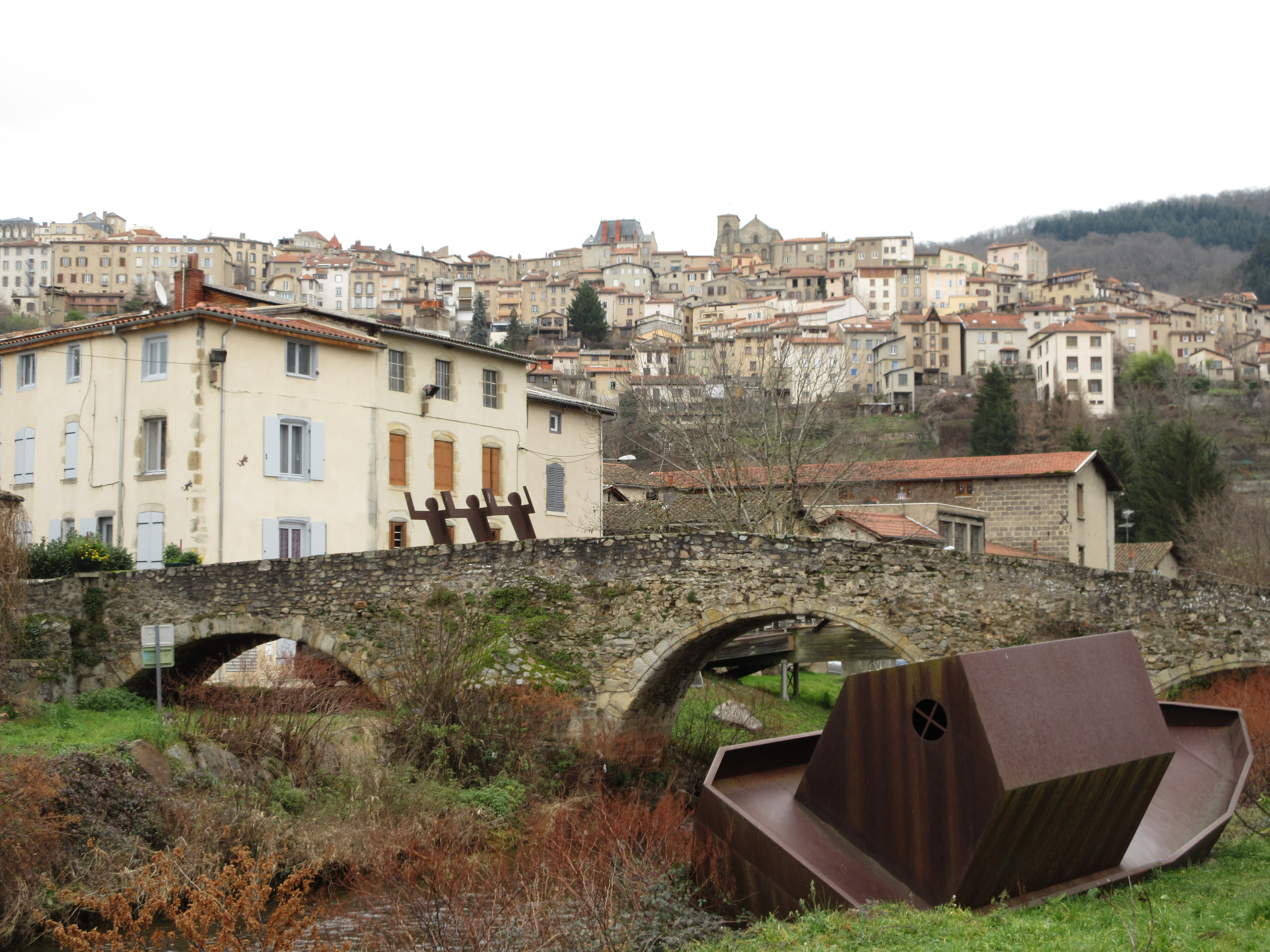
The upper city, with its medieval bridge, seen from the lower city

Le Moutier, a prosperous neighborhood, is between the lower city and the city center. The doors of the church of Saint-Symphorien depict the mouth of hell and the plants of the nearby valleys. Many knife manufacturers are in the neighborhood.

=== Hazards ===
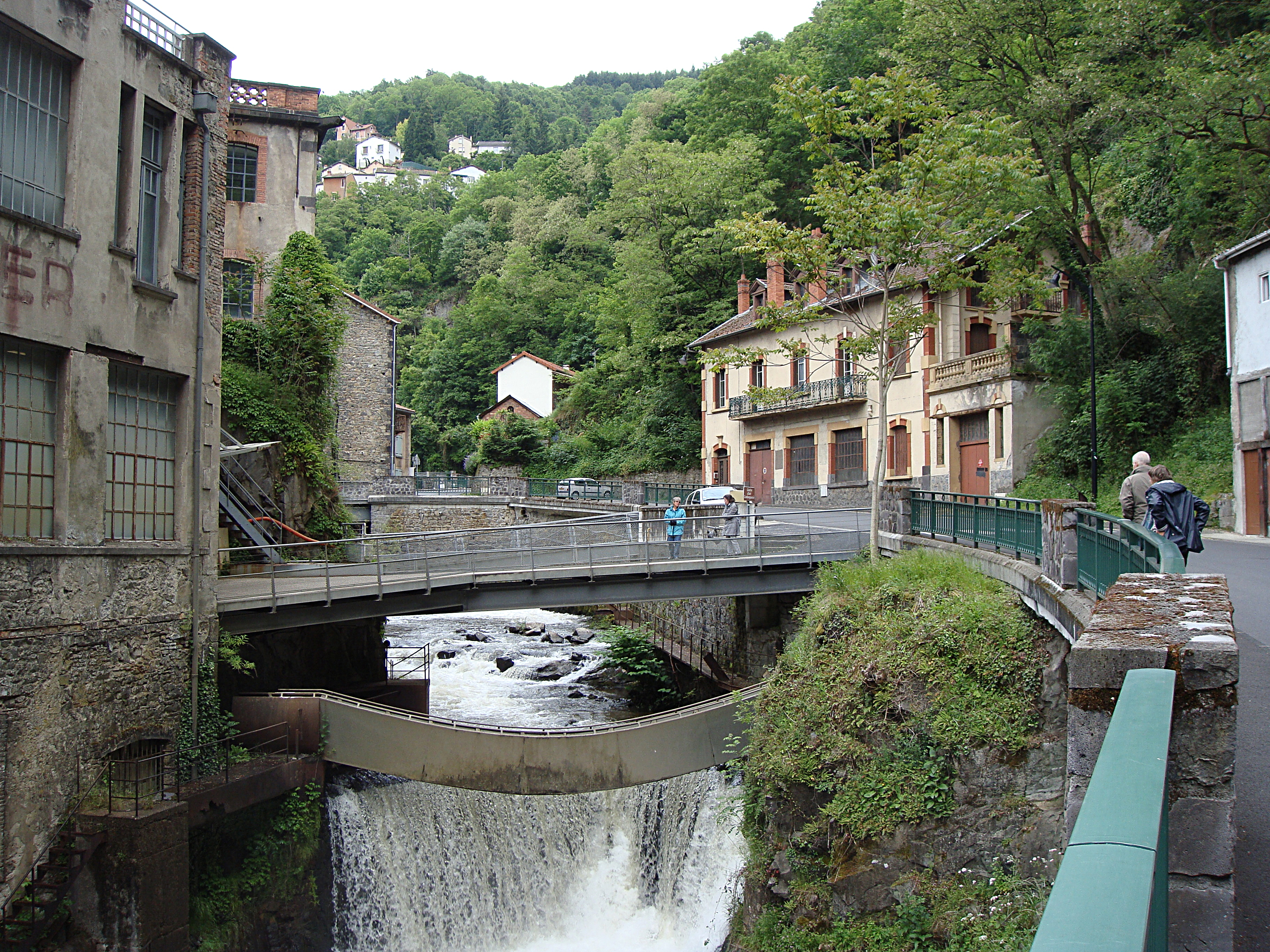
The Creux de l'Enfer in May 2014

Thiers is vulnerable to natural disasters. The north of the city experienced two landslides in 1984: one along the A89 autoroute and the other in the Vallée des Usines. Earthquakes may also occur in Thiers, which is classified as a Zone 3 Seismic Area (moderate seismicity). The city, which on the Dore and Durolle Rivers and a number of streams, has a history of flooding. Exceptional weather occurs every few decades, and winds of 150 km/h (93 mph) were recorded in the city centre in 1999.

In addition to natural hazards, the city is exposed to human-created risks. The 16-metre-high (52 ft) Membrun Dam, on the Durolle, is a kilometre from the city's outskirts. In 1999, the mountain overlooking the city was the target of arsonists who set fire to the forest near the Margerides cliff.

=== Environment ===
==== Parks and gardens ====
Verdun Square, on Rue Grammont, has a monument commemorating French efforts during World War I. Les Jardins de Saint-Jean are between the old Thiers hospital and the Durolle River. Le Breuil Park is a former campsite; locker rooms, showers, and camp toilets are still visible at the bottom of the park. The Chassaigne Castle features an English landscape garden.

A local fair is held during the third week of September in a park between the Orangerie Park and Le Breuil Park. There is a small green area opposite the Gare de Thiers (Thiers Station).

==== Protected areas ====
Natural areas surrounding Thiers are the Limagne plain in the west; the Dore valley, largely classified and protected by the Natura 2000 network; the Livradois-Forez Regional Natural Park, and the Auvergne volcanoes beyond the Limagne plain.

==== Urban renewal ====
Thiers began an urban renewal project in 2002, rehabilitating Antonin Chastel Place, the San Juan district and the Transvaal streets.

== Population ==
The first peak in population was reached in 1901, at 17,625. The population began a downward trend until the end of World War II, when it began climbing again to a second peak of 16,623 in 1968.

Historical population

Year	Pop.	±% p.a.
1793	11,970	—
1800	10,605	−1.71%
1806	10,743	+0.22%
1821	11,497	+0.45%
1831	9,836	−1.55%
1836	9,982	+0.30%
1841	9,981	−0.00%
1846	13,284	+5.88%
1851	13,964	+1.00%
1856	15,192	+1.70%
1861	15,901	+0.92%
1866	16,069	+0.21%
1872	16,635	+0.58%
1876	16,343	−0.44%
1881	15,333	−1.27%
1886	16,754	+1.79%
1891	16,814	+0.07%
1896	17,135	+0.38%
1901	17,625	+0.57%

Year	Pop.	±% p.a.
1906	17,418	−0.24%
1911	17,437	+0.02%
1921	16,239	−0.71%
1926	15,859	−0.47%
1931	16,383	+0.65%
1936	16,181	−0.25%
1946	15,409	−0.49%
1954	16,243	+0.66%
1962	16,369	+0.10%
1968	16,623	+0.26%
1975	16,567	−0.05%
1982	16,018	−0.48%
1990	14,832	−0.96%
1999	13,338	−1.17%
2007	12,196	−1.11%
2012	11,217	−1.66%
2017	11,847	+1.10%
2023	11,637	−0.30%

Source: EHESS and INSEE (1968-2023)

== History ==
=== Antiquity ===
Thiers is at the eastern end of the Roman road linking it to Lezoux. The road was part of the old national road 89, which has become Departmental Road 2089 and Secondary Road 62.

=== Middle Ages ===
The town was settled during the 10th century, when Malfred (granddaughter of the count of Auvergne) ordered the construction of a castle and church which became the church of Saint-Genès. In 1371, the Barony of Thiers passed to the Lords and then the Dukes of Bourbon.

=== French Revolution ===
The repression of counterrevolutionary activities in Thiers began in June 1791, after Louis XVI's flight to Varennes, intensifying in February 1793 against the clergy and triggering a wave of emigration which lasted until 1815. Although the Revolutionary Supervisory Committee was created on 22 May 1793, the committee was not very active; its prison opened in September. Forty-nine people were arrested in Thiers, primarily those involved in the revolts of Vollore-Ville and Servant, in October 1793.

=== World War II ===
Thiers was one of the few towns, and the only one in the Puy-de-Dôme, which was freed by arms on 25 August 1944. The fighting opposed the 400-strong SS Panzergrenadiers Training Battalion 18, which was sent to France on 22 June 1944 and reached Vichy on 29 June. The troops were divided among Thiers, Randan, Saint-Yorre, Le Mayet-de-Montagne, the Francs-Tireurs et Partisans (FTP) of the 103rd FFI battalion (led by Major André Rossignol, known as "Pigeon") and the 104th Battalion of Major Roger Beligat (alias "Alain Derval"). The mayor, appointed by the Vichy regime, and the sub-prefect were intermediaries between the FFI and the German troops.

== Economy ==
Thiers is known for its cutlery, and a museum in the old quarter exhibits the history of knife-making. Further along the valley, the industrial-heritage museum l'Usine du May, opened in 2009. Factories include Forges Gorce, who make blades for agricultural machinery from hedge trimmers to combine harvesters.

== Tourism ==
Thiers has seven hotels, six guest rooms, three gîtes, and three campsites. A tourist office is at the foot of the half-timbered castle of Pirou in the town center.

=== Museums ===
The Cutlery Museum has permanent and temporary exhibits and demonstrations of the work of cutlers. Le Creux de l'enfer is a center of contemporary art, with national and international programming.

=== Entertainment ===
Le Métro is a concert hall dedicated to contemporary music. The Moulin bleu is a cabaret. The three-screen Monaco Cinema has a varied program, and the local cinema club presents a film every month. Thiers was featured in François Truffaut's 1976 film, Small Change. It is the birthplace of journalist Claire Chazal and actor Zinedine Soualem.

=== Festivals ===
The annual Pamparina music festival has been held on the town streets during the first weekend in July since 1997. The international festival attracted over 45,000 people in 2016 and 2017. Each spring since 1991, the Coutellia knife festival has more than 100 exhibitors from around the world. The festival features demonstrations and friendly competition. A Christmas market has been held at three locations in the town center each December since 2012.

=== Leisure and sports ===
Thiers has three stadiums: the Antonin Chastel stadium in the lower town; the Gravels stadium in the upper town, and a stadium in the leisure centre of Iloa. The 70-hectare (170-acre) centre, Auvergne's largest, is part of the Natura 2000 network and the Livradois-Forez Regional Natural Park.

== Sister cities ==
Thiers has been a twin town of:

- Bridgnorth, England (since 1978)
- Schrobenhausen, Germany (since 1986)

== Gallery ==
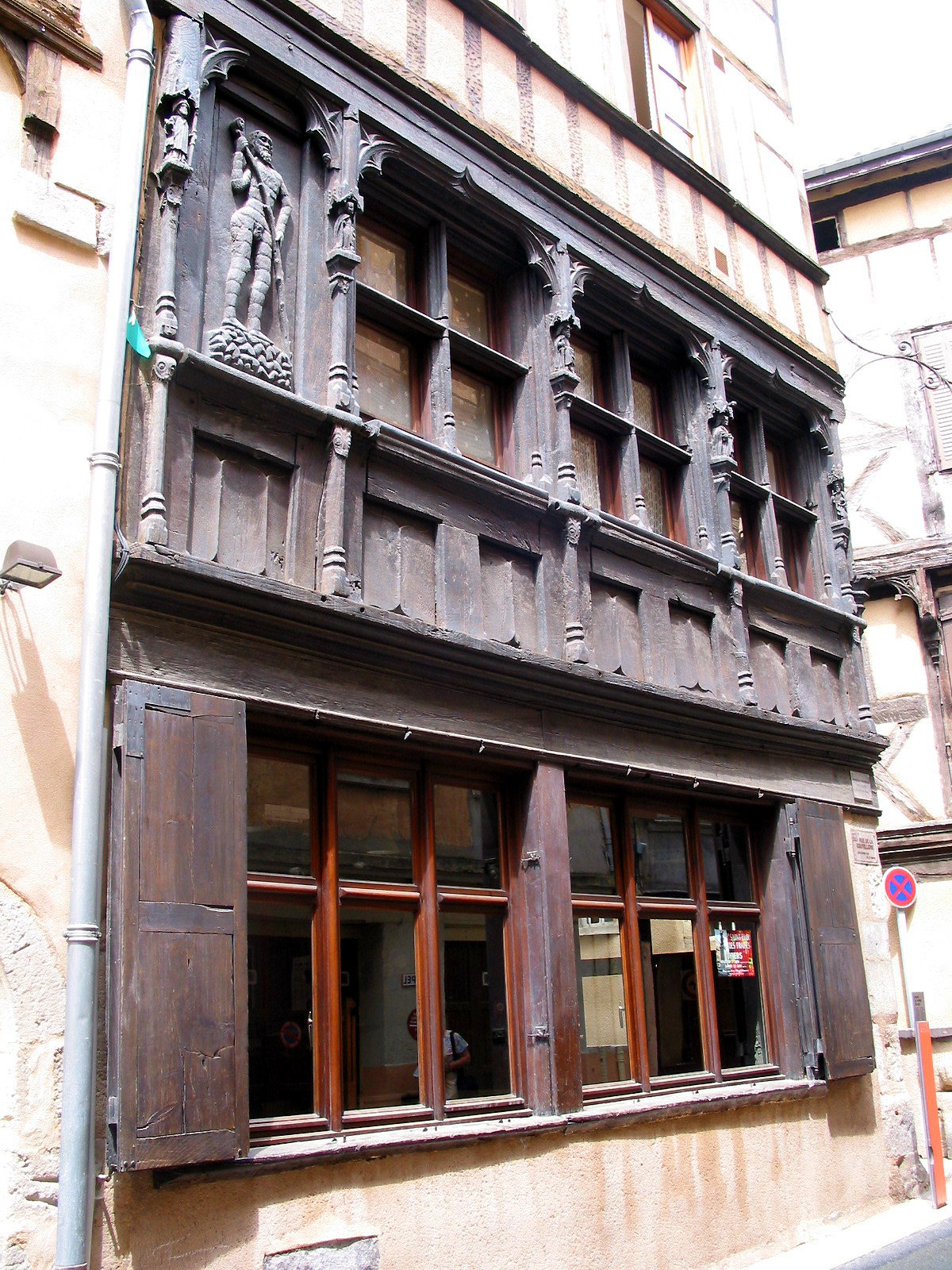
L'Homme des Bois

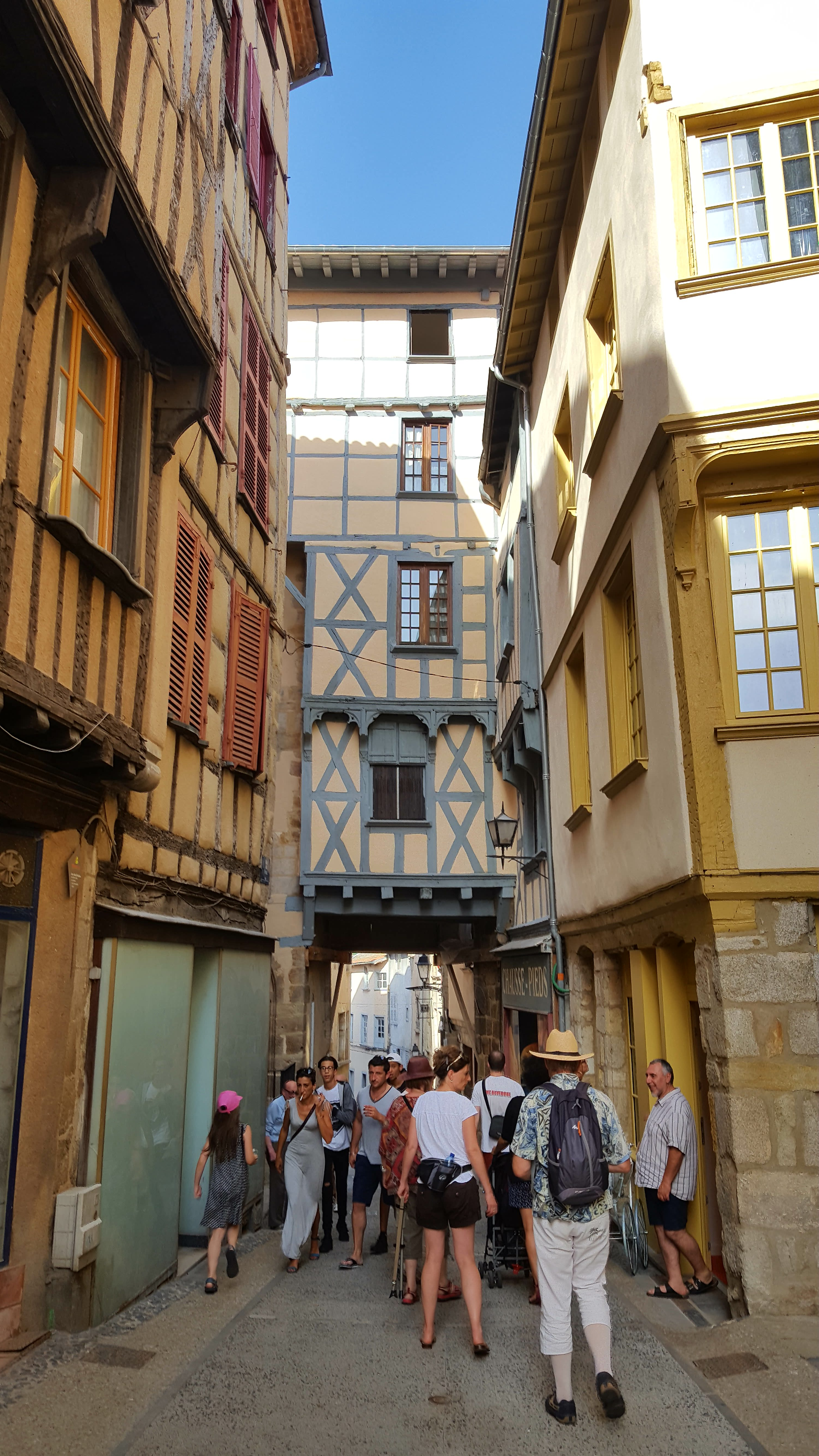
Medieval houses

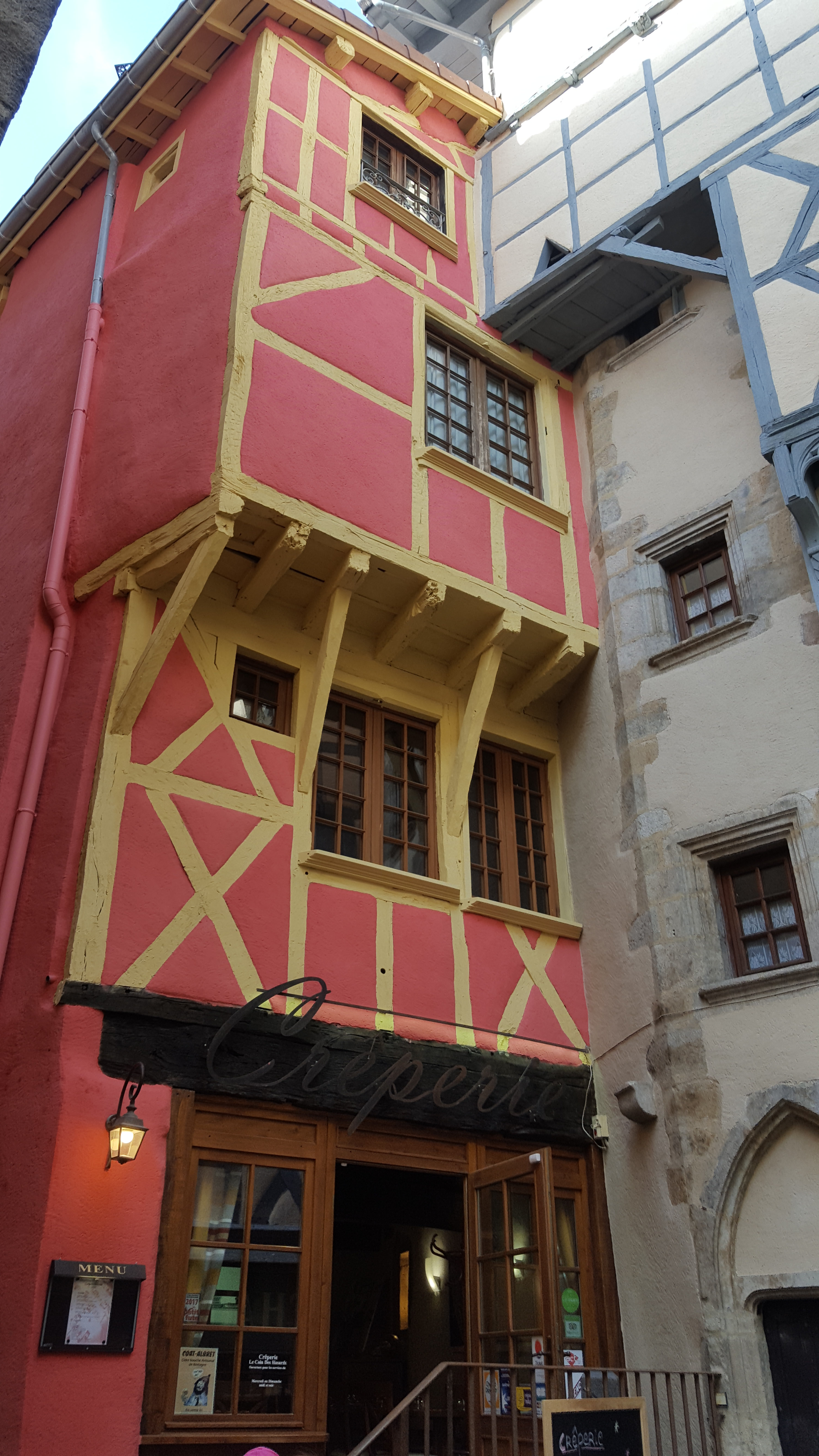
Creperie

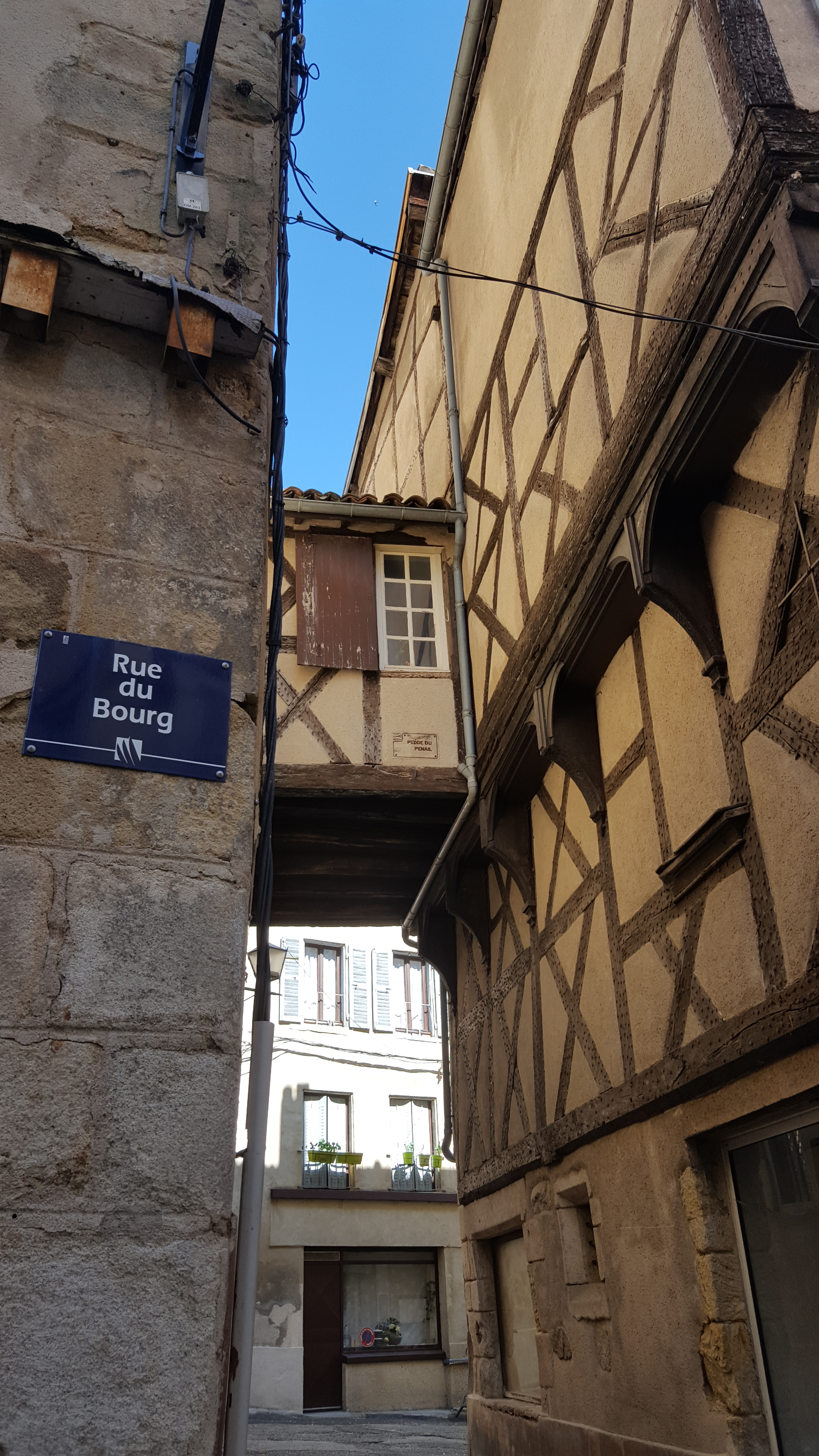
Overhead walkway

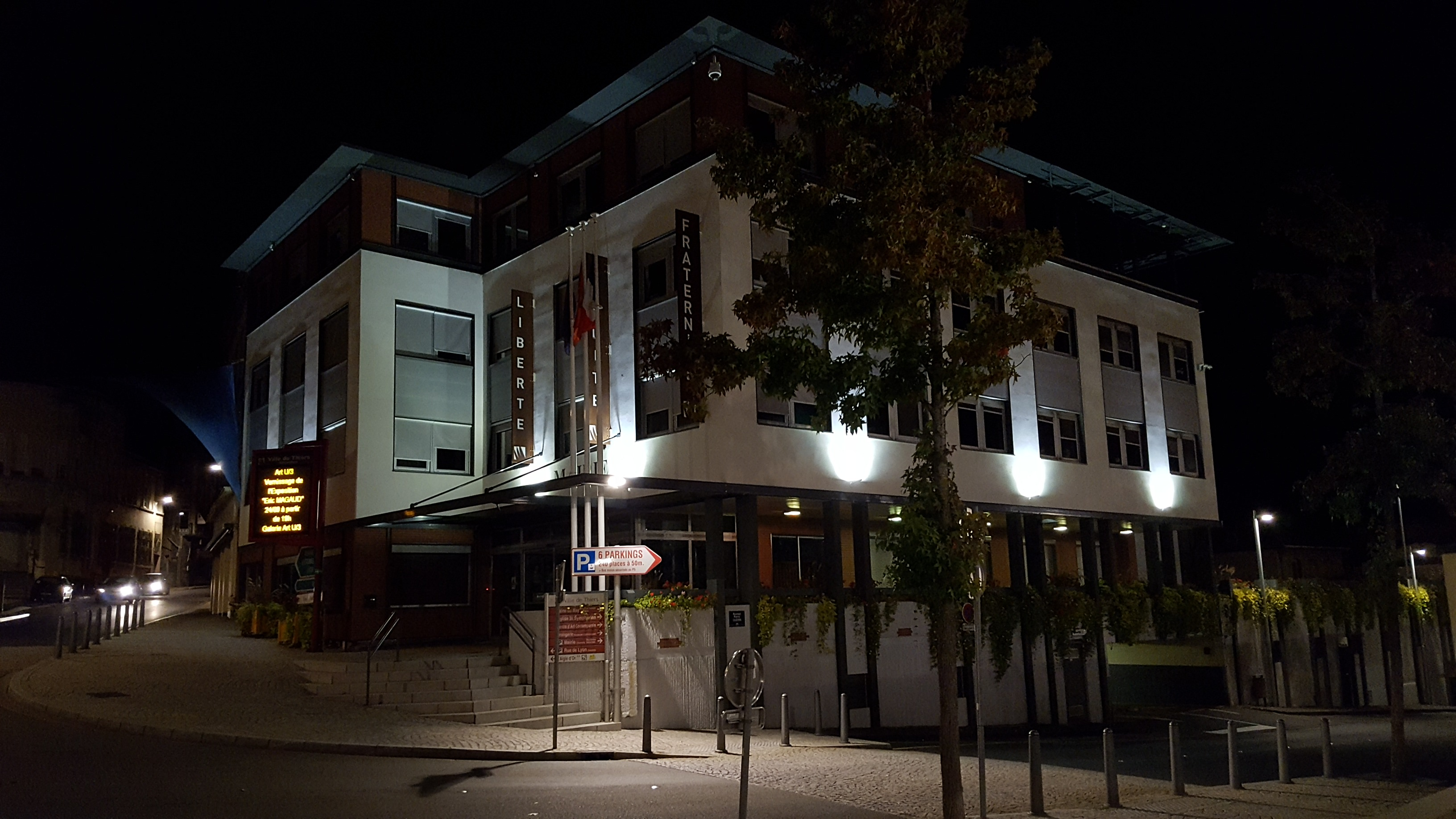
Hotel de ville at night

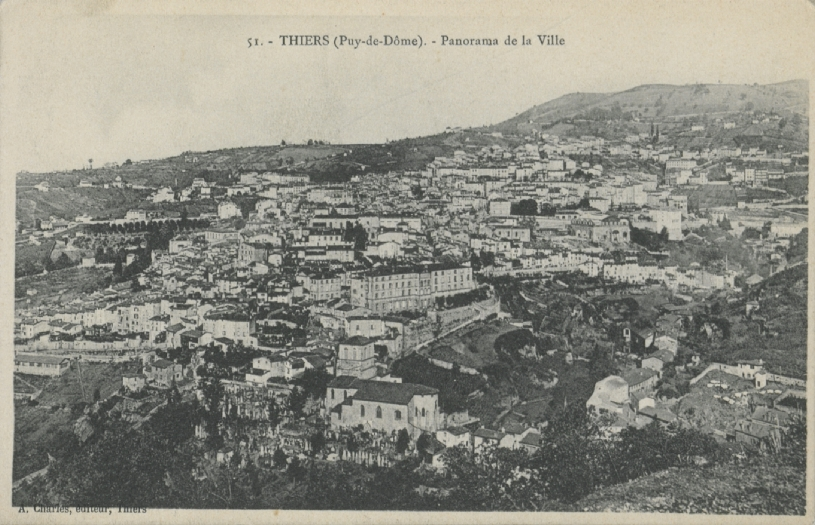
Aerial view in 1951

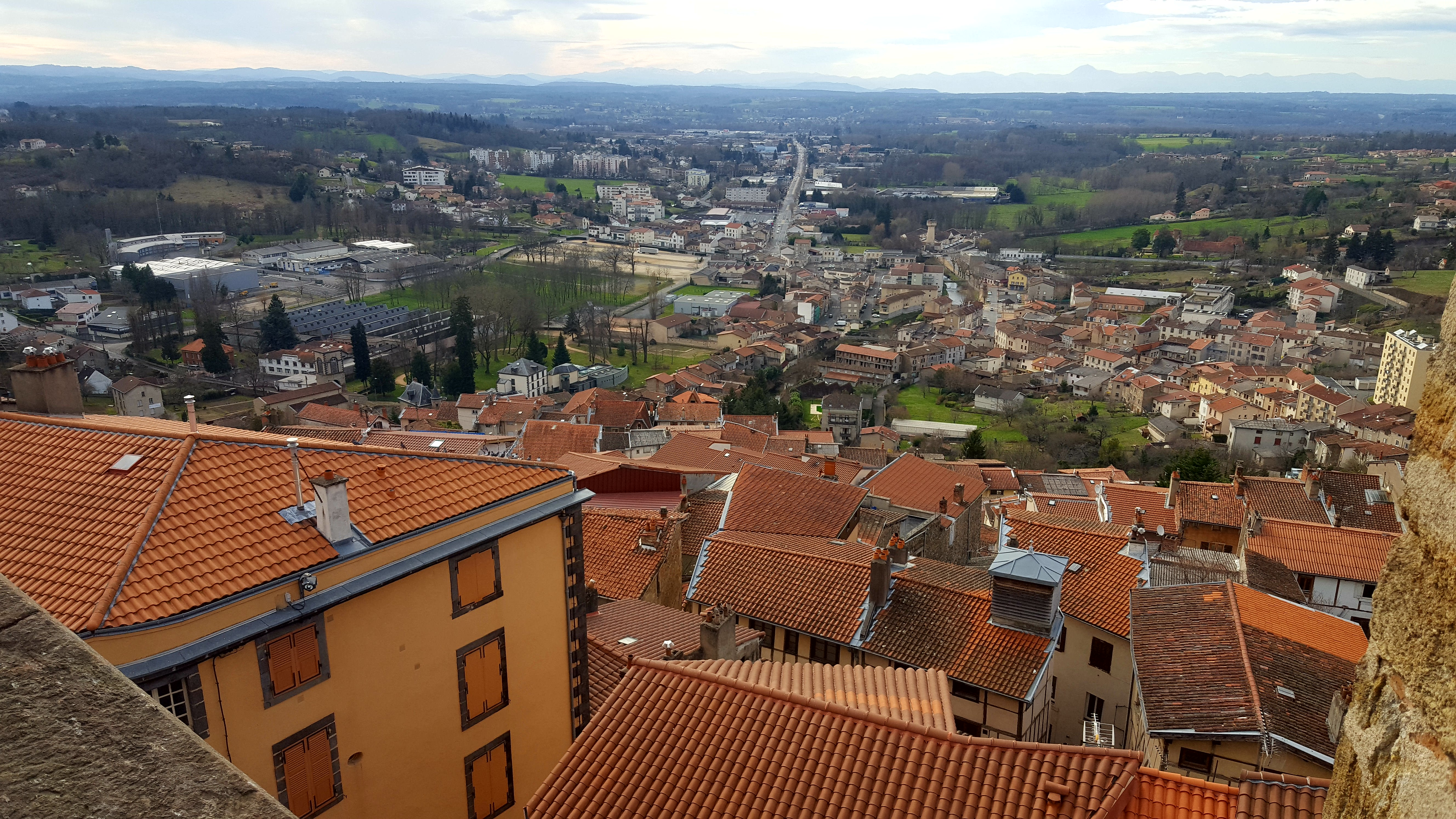
Lower town, seen from the upper

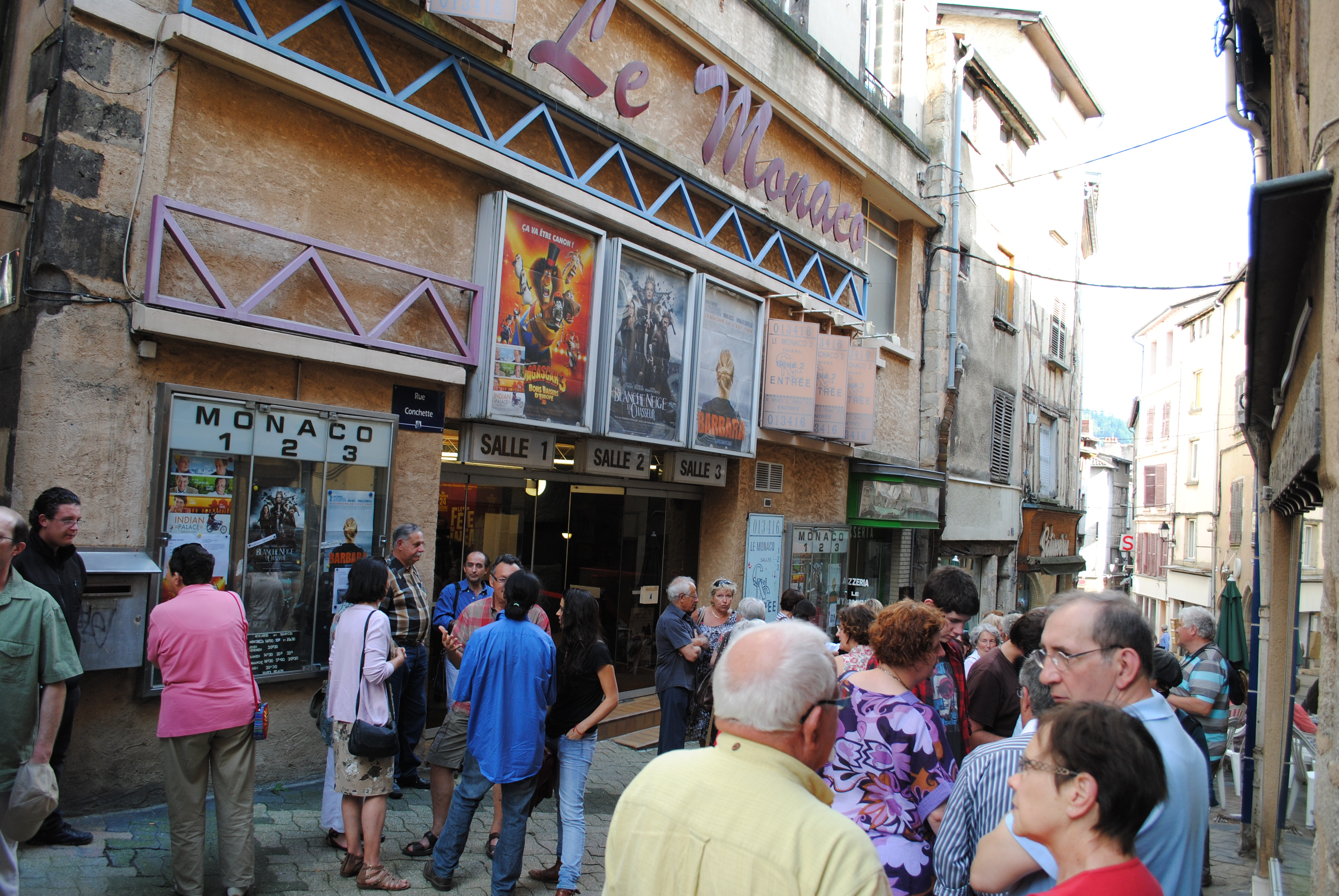
Monaco Cinema

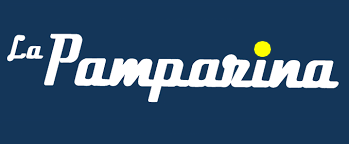
La Pamparina festival logo

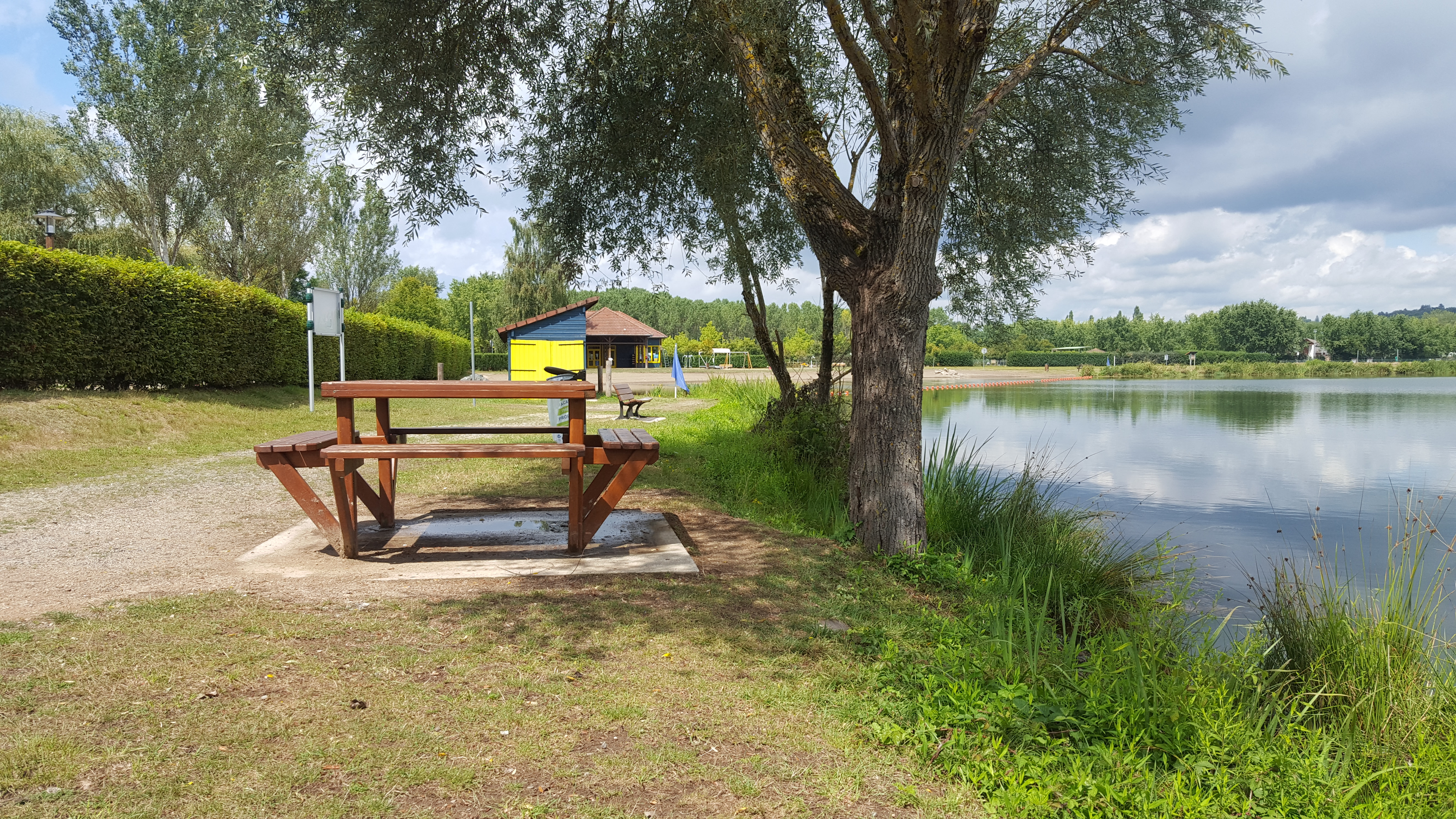
Leisure centre of Iloa

== Climate ==
Climate data for Thiers (Courpière), elevation 455 m (1,493 ft), (2003–2020 normals, extremes 2003–present)
Month	Jan	Feb	Mar	Apr	May	Jun	Jul	Aug	Sep	Oct	Nov	Dec	Year
Record high °C (°F)	20.1 (68.2)	22.1 (71.8)	26.2 (79.2)	28.7 (83.7)	31.8 (89.2)	39.4 (102.9)	39.2 (102.6)	40.3 (104.5)	36.1 (97.0)	32.0 (89.6)	25.1 (77.2)	19.6 (67.3)	40.3 (104.5)
Mean daily maximum °C (°F)	6.8 (44.2)	7.9 (46.2)	12.1 (53.8)	16.3 (61.3)	19.7 (67.5)	24.1 (75.4)	26.7 (80.1)	26.1 (79.0)	22.0 (71.6)	17.0 (62.6)	11.3 (52.3)	7.7 (45.9)	16.5 (61.7)
Daily mean °C (°F)	3.8 (38.8)	4.2 (39.6)	7.4 (45.3)	11.0 (51.8)	14.2 (57.6)	18.3 (64.9)	20.5 (68.9)	20.1 (68.2)	16.5 (61.7)	12.8 (55.0)	8.0 (46.4)	4.6 (40.3)	11.8 (53.2)
Mean daily minimum °C (°F)	0.8 (33.4)	0.4 (32.7)	2.7 (36.9)	5.7 (42.3)	8.7 (47.7)	12.5 (54.5)	14.3 (57.7)	14.0 (57.2)	11.0 (51.8)	8.6 (47.5)	4.6 (40.3)	1.5 (34.7)	7.1 (44.8)
Record low °C (°F)	−11.5 (11.3)	−15.4 (4.3)	−15.6 (3.9)	−3.2 (26.2)	0.1 (32.2)	3.2 (37.8)	6.3 (43.3)	5.6 (42.1)	1.8 (35.2)	−4.6 (23.7)	−7.2 (19.0)	−11.2 (11.8)	−15.6 (3.9)
Average precipitation mm (inches)	54.8 (2.16)	45.1 (1.78)	51.9 (2.04)	74.2 (2.92)	105.7 (4.16)	86.7 (3.41)	84.6 (3.33)	84.9 (3.34)	72.3 (2.85)	82.1 (3.23)	73.5 (2.89)	61.1 (2.41)	876.9 (34.52)
Average precipitation days (≥ 1.0 mm)	10.7	9.4	10.7	9.8	11.4	9.4	8.3	8.2	7.7	9.8	10.3	11.3	117.0
Source: Meteociel

== See also ==
- Laguiole knife
- Marjacq knife
- Communes of the Puy-de-Dôme department
- Durolle
- Thiers old hospital
- Vallée des Usines
- Thiers ramparts
- Church of St John, Thiers
- Forges Mondière
- Cutlery of Thiers
