= Guy Cheron =

Belgian neuroscientist

- Born: 1 July 1955 (age 71)
- Education: Université libre de Bruxelles
- Scientific career
- Fields: Neurophysiologist
- Workplaces: Université libre de Bruxelles, Université de Mons
- Patrons: Lawrence Stark, JE Desmedt

Guy Cheron (born 1 July 1955) is a professor of neurophysiology and movement biomechanics. He works at the Faculty of Motor Science in the Université libre de Bruxelles and is a professor of neuropsychology at the Faculty of Psychology and Education Sciences in the University of Mons. He is the co-founder of the spinoff Human Waves.

== Career ==
Born in Halle, Belgium, Guy obtained a MS degree in motor sciences and his PhD under the supervision of JE Desmedt at the Brain Research Unit of the Université libre de Bruxelles where he defended an Aggregation Thesis in Neuroscience. He was visiting professor (OTAN-fellow) at the Department of Engineering of the University of California, Berkeley. Thereafter he joined the University of Mons as Assistant Professor before becoming head of the Laboratory of Neurophysiology and Movement Biomechanics at the Université libre de Bruxelles in 1992.

== Research ==
In 1986, he described, together with E. Godaux, the localization of the oculomotor neural integrator (NI) in the nucleus prepositus of the cat. This demonstrated that a brainstem neural network is able to perform mathematical integration. From 1986 to 1997, he worked on the physiological properties of the NI. During the last 20 years, he worked conjunctly in mouse and human neurophysiology. He also found 160–200 Hz oscillation in the cerebellum of different mouse models presenting neurological diseases ranging from cerebellar ataxia, Angelman syndrome, FAS and Steinert disease. He also participated in neuroscience space experiences realized on board of the International Space Station (NeuroCog, NeuroSpat, and Adriadna ESA missions) where his group investigated with EEG dynamics the alteration of top-down signals in visual perception in weightlessness environment. This neurophysiological expertise was also applied in the field of non-invasive BCI (Mindwalker, FP7 project) and in the search of the cerebral oscillations linked to the psychological flow in the top performance.

He is specialty Chief Editor at Frontiers in Psychology, Movement Sciences and Sport Psychology.

== Honours and awards ==
- Officer of the Order of Leopold II for outstanding research activities
- Prix de Biomécanique, Paris, 1987
- Prix MAAF Santé, Montréal, 2000
- Prix Science & Innovation, 2015, Comité Olympique Interfédéral Belge

== Selected publications ==
1. Desmedt JE, Cheron G (1980). "Central somatosensory conduction in man: Neural generators and interpeak latencies of the far-field components recorded from neck and right or left scalp and earlobes". Electroencephalography and Clinical Neurophysiology. 50 (5–6): 382–403. doi:10.1016/0013-4694(80)90006-1. hdl:2013/ULB-DIPOT:oai:dipot.ulb.ac.be:2013/55709. PMID 6160982. S2CID 4525501.
2. Cheron G, Godaux E, Laune JM, Vanderkelen B (1986). "Lesions in the cat prepositus complex: Effects on the vestibulo-ocular reflex and saccades". The Journal of Physiology. 372: 75–94. doi:10.1113/jphysiol.1986.sp015998. PMC 1192752. PMID 3487644.
3. Cheron G, Godaux E (1987). "Disabling of the oculomotor neural integrator by kainic acid injections in the prepositus-vestibular complex of the cat". The Journal of Physiology. 394: 267–290. doi:10.1113/jphysiol.1987.sp016870. PMC 1191961. PMID 3443967.
4. Godaux E, Mettens P, Cheron G (1993). "Differential effect of injections of kainic acid into the prepositus and the vestibular nuclei of the cat". The Journal of Physiology. 472: 459–482. doi:10.1113/jphysiol.1993.sp019956. PMC 1160496. PMID 8145154.
5. Cheron G, Godaux E (1987). "Disabling of the oculomotor neural integrator by kainic acid injections in the prepositus-vestibular complex of the cat". The Journal of Physiology. 394: 267–290. doi:10.1113/jphysiol.1987.sp016870. PMC 1191961. PMID 3443967.
6. Servais L, Hourez R, Bearzatto B, Gall D, Schiffmann SN, Cheron G (2007). "Purkinje cell dysfunction and alteration of long-term synaptic plasticity in fetal alcohol syndrome". Proceedings of the National Academy of Sciences. 104 (23): 9858–9863. Bibcode:2007PNAS..104.9858S. doi:10.1073/pnas.0607037104. PMC 1887541. PMID 17535929.
7. Cheron G, Cebolla A, Petieau M, Bengoetxea A, Palmero-Soler E, Leroy A, Dan B (2009). Chapter 13 Adaptive Changes of Rhythmic EEG Oscillations in Space. International Review of Neurobiology. Vol. 86. pp. 171–187. doi:10.1016/S0074-7742(09)86013-3. ISBN 9780123748218. PMID 19607999.
8. Cheron G, Márquez-Ruiz J, Cheron J, Prigogine C, Ammann C, Lukowski R, Ruth P, Dan B (2018). "Purkinje cell BKchannel ablation induces abnormal rhythm in deep cerebellar nuclei and prevents Ltd". Scientific Reports. 8 (1): 4220. Bibcode:2018NatSR...8.4220C. doi:10.1038/s41598-018-22654-6. PMC 5845018. PMID 29523816.
9. Pusil, S., Zegarra-Valdivia, J., Cuesta, P. et al. [... Guy Cheron]: Effects of spaceflight on the EEG alpha power and functional connectivity. Sci Rep 13, 9489 (2023). https://doi.org/10.1038/s41598-023-34744-1.
