= Aimée Julie Cheron =

French painter

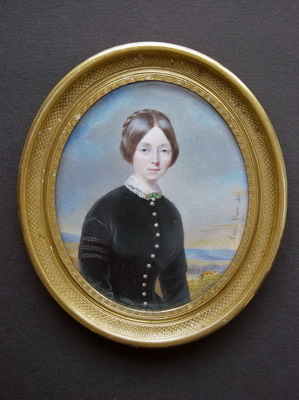
- Portrait miniature on ivory of a young Lady painted in 1847 by Aimée Jovin Cheron
- Born: Aimée Julie Jovin; 26 April 1821; Paris, France
- Died: c. 1890 (aged 68–69)
- Known for: Miniature painting
- Spouse: Amedée Paul Cheron

Aimée Julie Cheron (née Jovin; 26 April 1821 – c. 1890) was a French miniature painter.

== Biography ==
Cheron was born in Paris and was a pupil of François Meuret (1800–1887). She belonged to the Salon in Paris from 1846 to 1870. After 1870, when the popularity of portrait miniature started declining, Cheron only painted still portraits and landscapes on porcelain. She lived for a long time in Paris, at 52 rue De Chabrol, then at 22 rue Montholon and finally, in the last years of her life at Samois-sur-Seine.

On 27 August 1850, she married Amedée Paul Cheron (Paris, 11 March 1819 – 5 May 1881) and they had one son, Jacques Paul (b. 12 April 1853). On 7 July 1881, Jacques Paul married Lucie (Lucy) Josephine Fehrenbach (born 19 December 1856), who was a pupil of her mother and a miniature painter in Paris where she lived at 18 rue de L’Ancienne Comédie. She participated to the Salon in Paris from 1875 to 1880 and also painted the portrait of the poet François Coppée. In 1881, after the death of Amedée, Aimee was granted a civil pension.

Amedée was a well known bibliographer, who in 1845, entered the Imperial Library as director of the department for reprinting rare books regarding fine art and French history. In 1855/1856 he wrote, for the editor Jannet, the General catalogue of all literary works published in the period 1800–1855 and an additional book for Causeries du Lundi by Charles Augustin Sainte-Beuve. Aimée’s style was very detailed, in the pointillist style typical of her teacher Francois Meuret. This style was also adopted by another of Meuret's pupils, Camille Cornéile Isbert (1825–1911), who often exhibited her miniatures at the Salon together with Aimée. She was a good drawer, she treated with great care all the details of the sitter's face, especially the skin tones. Also the clothing is painted with great attention and the backgrounds are various: landscapes, interiors, or simple monochrome. She had a deep faculty of introspection and succeeded in rendering the temperamental and psychological dimension of the sitters.

She signed her miniatures "Aimée Jovin" until 1850. From 1852 to 1872 she showed at the Salon, signing her pieces as "Aimée Cheron". Cheron was also the surname of another painter and miniaturist, Elisabeth Sophie Cheron (1684–1711). Among her pupils was Tatiane Gerardin, who exhibited her works at the Salon from 1875 to 1885. In 1865, Aimee was represented in a marble bust by the sculptor Charles Cordier (1827–1905), which is now in the private collection of the descendants of Cordier.

== Works ==
- Porcelain plaque of floral bouquet, signed Aimée Jovin and dated 1839.
- Porcelain plaque, with colourful painted bouquet of flowers in porcelain vase, drops of water, ladybirds and branches of flowers on a stone slab, signed Aimée Jovin and dated 1841;
- Portrait of a young lady, hair dressed with curling decorated with fresh flowers signed Aimée Jovin and dated 1841;
- Portrait of a young lady signed Aimée Jovin and dated 1845;
- Portrait of a young lady with centre-parted brown hair, sky background signed Aimée Jovin and dated 1846;
- Decorations for the book Contes written by Charles Nodier (1780–1844) and illustrated by Tony Johannot (1803–1852), published in Paris by J. Hetzel in 1846;
- Portrait of a young lady wearing a black velvet dress with lace collar, pearl buttons, and emerald brooch against a deep and sunny landscape with a palace in the foreground on the left of the sitter signed Aimée Jovin and dated 1847;
- Portrait of Marie-Madeleine-Charlotte Bailleul signed Aimée Jovin and dated 1847;
- Portrait of a lady wearing a blue headband and a white dress with a floral bouquet signed Aimée Jovin Cheron (1850?)
- Portrait of Mlle Fontane signed Aimée Cheron and dated 1852;
- Portrait of Mme C. Dorvault signed Aimée Cheron and dated 1852;
- Portrait of Mlle Les Aulnaies signed Aimée Cheron and dated 1852;
- Portrait of a young boy signed Aimée Cheron and dated 1857;
- Portrait of the Author's son Jacques Paul signed Aimée Cheron and dated October 1861;
- Portrait of Mlle Marguerite Devant signed Aimée Cheron and dated 1869;
- Portrait of Mlle Lucy Fehrenbach, signed Aimée Cheron and dated 1869;
- Portrait of the Count of Riboisiére Charles Honore, the eldest son of the Captain of Artillery of the Imperial Guard signed Aimée Cheron from Gros (1875?);
- Portrait of the Countess of Riboisiére signed Aimée Cheron from Kinson (1875?)
