= François Chéron (writer) =

French writer and a senior official

François Cheron, dit Chéron, (17 June 1764 in Paris – 16 January 1829), was a French writer and a senior official.

== Biography ==
The son of an "entrepreneur ordinaire des travaux du roi", François Chéron manifested his royalist leanings from the beginning of the French Revolution, he is arrested in 1793 due to his monarchist views. It seems he then turned to the theater, writing anonymously, including a satirical comedy alongside comedian Louis-Benoît Picard.

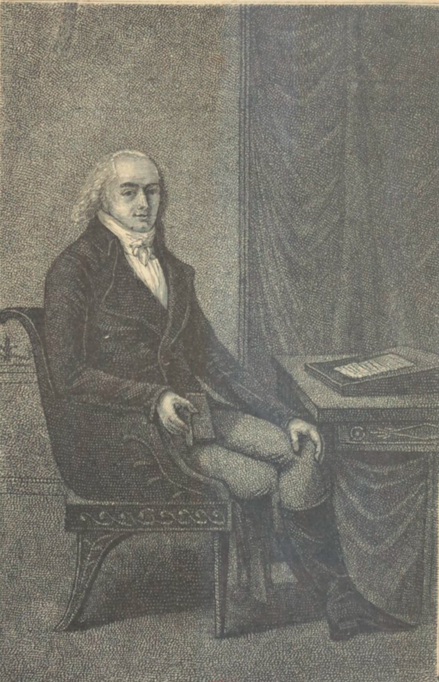
François Chéron

En 1812, he starts publishing the Correspondance littéraire, philosophique et critique by Diderot and Grimm but faces censorship. In 1814 he expressed his antibonapartism, called for freedom of the press, which led to his arrest during the Hundred Days.

En 1818, he was appointed government commissioner for the Théâtre français, a position he held until 9 July 1825, the day he was named Knight of the Legion of Honour in recognition of his services.

He committed some poems and literary critics hostile to his contemporary romantics.

He has written souvenirs in relation to the Bourbon Restoration.

== Texts ==
- Observations d'un citoyen : sur la nécessité et la possibilité d'établir un impôt unique, en remplacement des tailles, capitation, aides, gabelles et tabac, 1789.
- Duhautcours ou, Le contrat d'union, comédie en prose et en cinq actes représentée pour la première fois au théâtre de Louvois par les Comédiens de l'Odéon, le 18 thermidor an 9 par Louis-Benoît Picard et le C^{en} *** [Chéron], Paris, Chez Huet, An IX (1801).
- La Correspondance littéraire, philosophique et critique, adressée à un souverain d'Allemagne depuis 1753 jusqu'en 1769 par le baron de Grimm et Diderot, Paris, H. Fournier Jeune, 4 tomes, 1813-1829.
- Sur la liberté de la presse, Paris, Pillet, 1814.
- Napoléon, ou le Corse dévoilé, ode aux Français, Paris, Le Normant, 1814.
- [éd. avec Luglien-François Thory], Correspondance inédite de Grimm et Diderot. Recueil de lettres, poésies, morceaux et fragmens retranchés par la censure impériale en 1812 et 1813, Paris, H. Fournier Jeune, 1829.
- F. Hervé-Bazin (éd.), Mémoires et récits de François Chéron... avec lettres inédites des principaux écrivains de la Restauration, Paris, Librairie de la Société bibliographique, 1882.
