= Saint-Chéron =

Saint-Chéron may refer to:

- Saint-Chéron, Marne, a commune of the Champagne-Ardenne region of France
- Saint-Chéron, Essonne, a commune of the Île-de-France region
