= Bruguière =

Bruguière is a surname. Notable people with the surname include:

- Barthélemy Bruguière (1792–1835), first Apostolic Vicar of Korea
- Jean-Louis Bruguière (born 1943), French judge
- Jean Guillaume Bruguière (1749 or 1750–1798), French physician, zoologist, diplomat
- Jean Pierre Joseph Bruguière (1772–1813), French general
- Francis Bruguière (1879–1944), American photographer
