= Louis-Claude Chéron de La Bruyère =

French politician and playwright (1758–1807)

Louis-Claude Chéron de La Bruyère (28 October 1758, in Paris – 13 November 1807, in Poitiers) was a French politician, playwright and translator.

== Works ==
Theatre

- Caton d'Utique, tragedy in 3 acts and in verse, imitated from Addison (1789)
- L'Homme à sentimens, ou le Tartuffe de mœurs, comedy in 5 acts and in verse, partly imitated from The School for Scandal by Sheridan, Paris, French comedians of the Comédie Italienne, 10 March 1789. Reworked and abridged under the title Valsain et Florville (1803).

Translations

- Richard Lovell Edgeworth and Maria Edgeworth: Leçons de l'enfance (5 volumes, 1803)
- Elizabeth Hamilton: Lettres sur les principes élémentaires d'éducation (2 volumes, 1804)
- Henry Fielding: Tom Jones, or Histoire d'un enfant trouvé (6 volumes, 1804)

== Sources ==
- Henri Mataigne, Histoire d'Auvers sur Oise.
- "Louis-Claude Chéron de La Bruyère", in Adolphe Robert and Gaston Cougny, Dictionnaire des parlementaires français (1789–1891), Bourloton, Paris, 1889 Edition details Wikisource
