= Vallée des Usines =

Building complex in Thiers, France

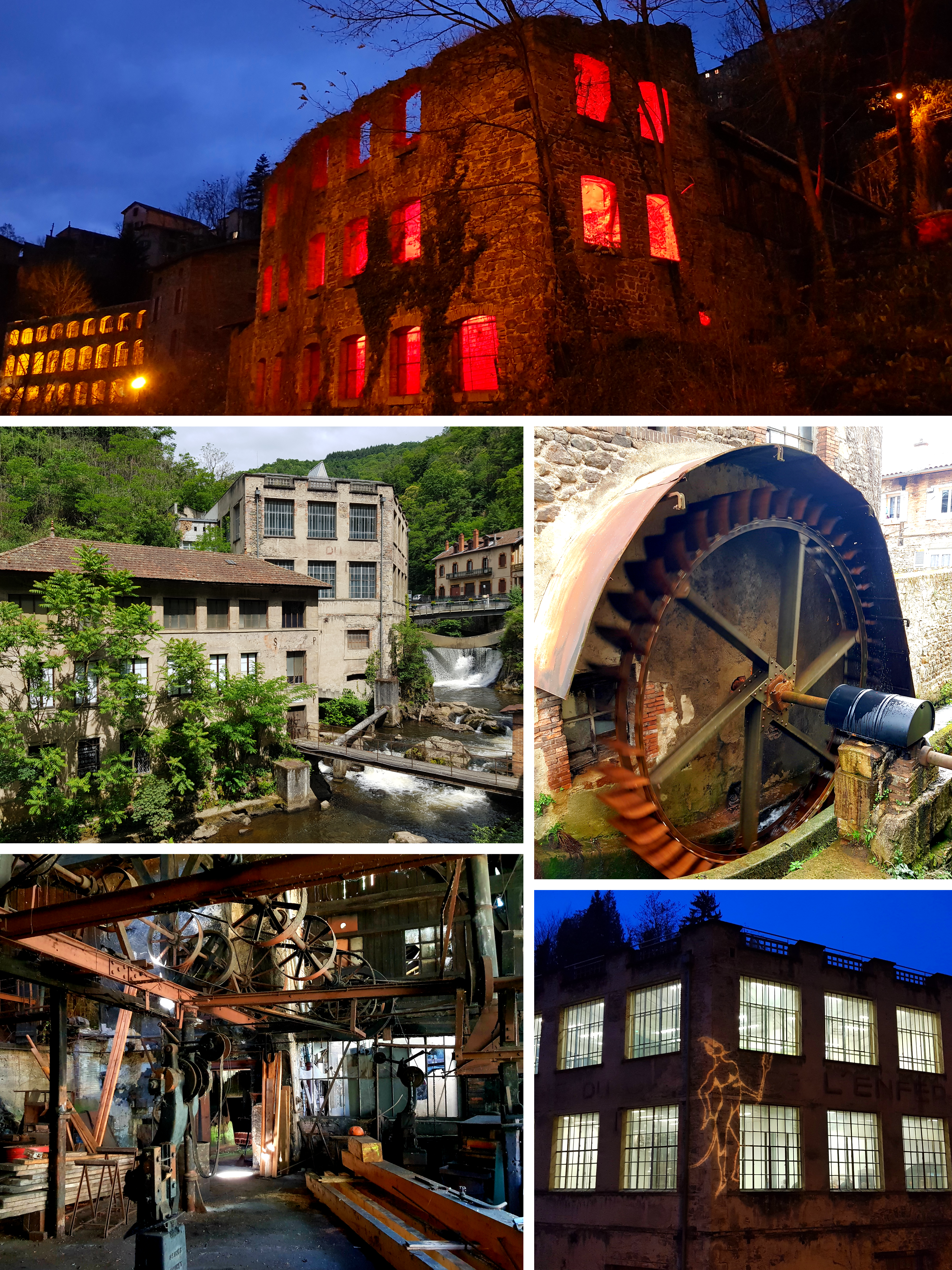
- Top: ruined factories illuminated at night; middle: on the left, the Entraygues and Creux de l'enfer factories near the Durolle river, and on the right, a working water wheel at Navarron island; bottom: on the left, Forges Mondière, and on the right, the illuminated façade of Creux de l'enfer.

- Location within Auvergne-Rhône-Alpes Location within France
- Length: 1.4 km (0.87 mi)

Naming
- English translation: Valley of Factories

Geography
- Country: France
- State: Puy-de-Dôme
- Region: Auvergne-Rhône-Alpes
- Population center: Thiers
- Coordinates: 45°51′02″N 3°33′01″E
- Interactive map of Vallée des Usines
- The valley outflow is located at Durolle

The Vallée des Usines (lit. French for Valley of Factories) is the name given to part of the Durolle valley, mainly located in the commune of Thiers in the French department of Puy-de-Dôme and the Auvergne-Rhône-Alpes region. The area is known for its long industrial past, as the power of the Durolle river has been harnessed here since the Middle Ages. The middle of the 20th century saw the departure of companies to the plains of the lower town of Thiers.

From 1985, when the Creux de l'Enfer contemporary art center opened in a former knife making factory, the valley found a cultural and touristic vocation, with several factories turning to various activities of this type since the beginning of the 21st century.

In 2021 the municipality of Thiers announced that major projects for the conversion of abandoned factories were being studied in the valley, notably in conjunction with the Fondation du Patrimoine and the Stéphane Bern Mission.

== Toponymy ==
The term "Vallée des Usines" (Valley of Factories) is used to describe the part of the Durolle valley where the number of factories used to be very high. The name didn't become official until the mid-20th century.

== Geography ==
=== Geographic location ===
To the north, the valley begins at the Seychalles bridge. It widens from east to west over a length of 1,400 m to its eastern end, marked by the Navarron islet. The Vallée des Usines is located on the eastern slope of the Durolle river in the Puy-de-Dôme département (administrative region of Auvergne-Rhône-Alpes).

=== Topography ===
The valley has been carved out over the centuries by the Durolle river in the Forez mountains, north of the Massif Central (Note: The commune of Thiers marks the north-western limit of the Monts du Forez.) and it extends from where it meets the Vallée des Rouets, downstream, to the Limagne plain. The northern part of the valley is rugged, with several peaks over 600 m high. Further inland, towards the Creux de l'Enfer contemporary art center and the May factory, the Durolle canyon are deeper and more tortuous. This is where the river is at its most rugged. The south-western part of the valley, after the Ferrier factory, flattens out before opening onto the Limagne.

Until the 13th century, the Vallée des Usines was a vine-growing area, cultivated on the heights overlooking the valley. Many traces of this culture are still present; in 2012, in memory of this past, vines were planted by the municipality of Thiers in the gardens of the old hospital, in the central part of the valley.

The soil of the valley is part of the geological Massif Central, mainly made up of various granites, sometimes composed of grus and scree.

=== Hydrography ===
Map of the vallée des Usines.

The Vallée des Usines is drained by the Durolle river, which has a catchment area of 1,456 km². The river has been exploited for its motive power, used in particular to drive knife blade sharpening mechanisms. The river has also been used for trout fishing since water quality improved in the early 21st century.

=== Demographics ===
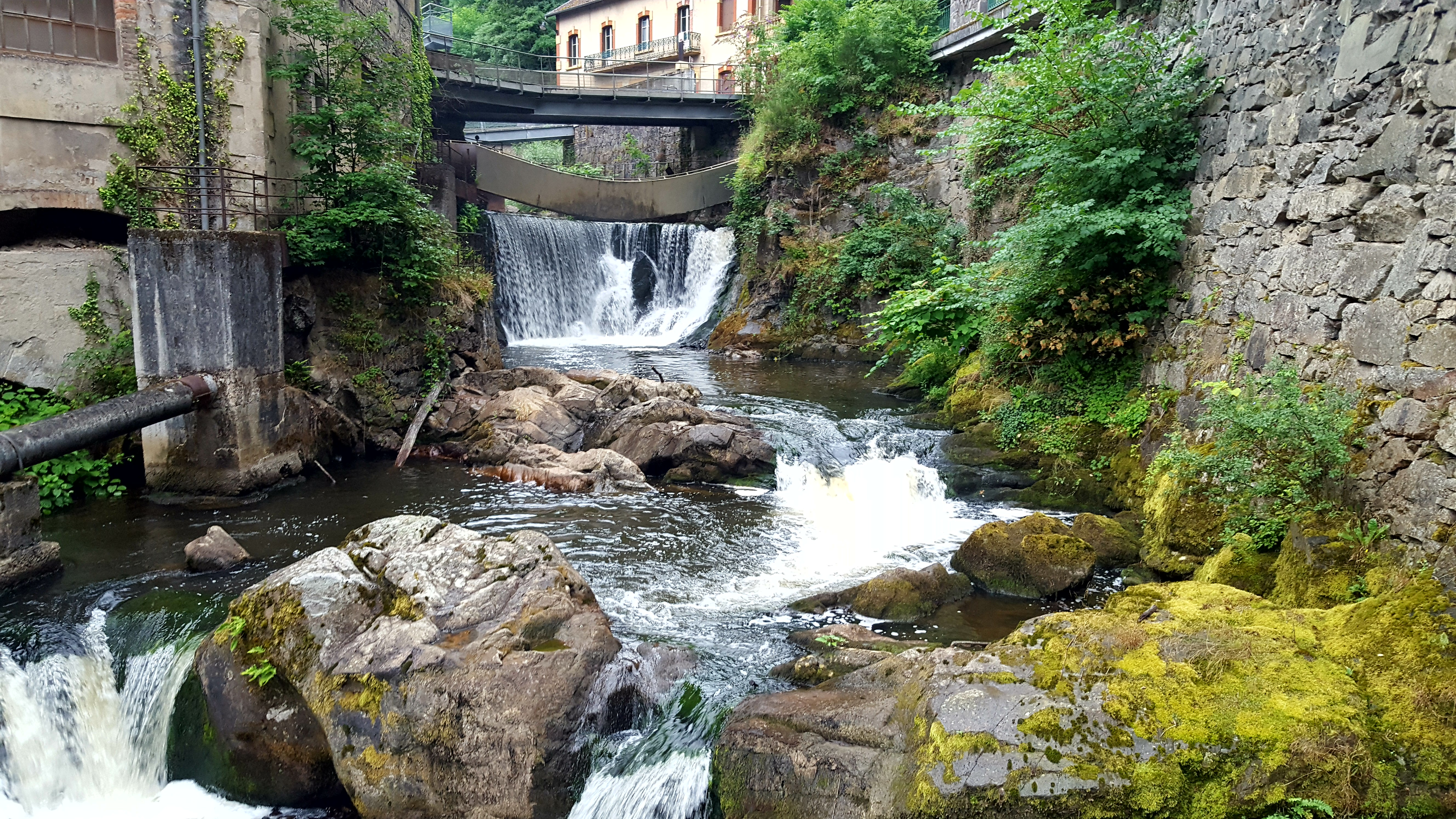
The Durolle near Creux de l'Enfer.

The commune of Thiers is home to most of the Vallée des Usines. Further upstream, the Durolle flows through the communes of La Monnerie-le-Montel, Celles-sur-Durolle, Les Salles, Cervières, Noirétable and Chabreloche. The total number of inhabitants in these communes was 18,802 at the 2015 census.

=== Transportation ===
The main thoroughfare is Route Départementale 45, known as Avenue Joseph-Claussat as it passes through Thiers, which runs along the left bank of the river, following its curvature from north to southwest. The majority of factories are located along this road. The valley is served by the Thiers urban transport network (TUT). The Thiers train station is located 1,400 m from the Seychalles bridge in the north of the valley.

== History ==
=== Middle Ages ===
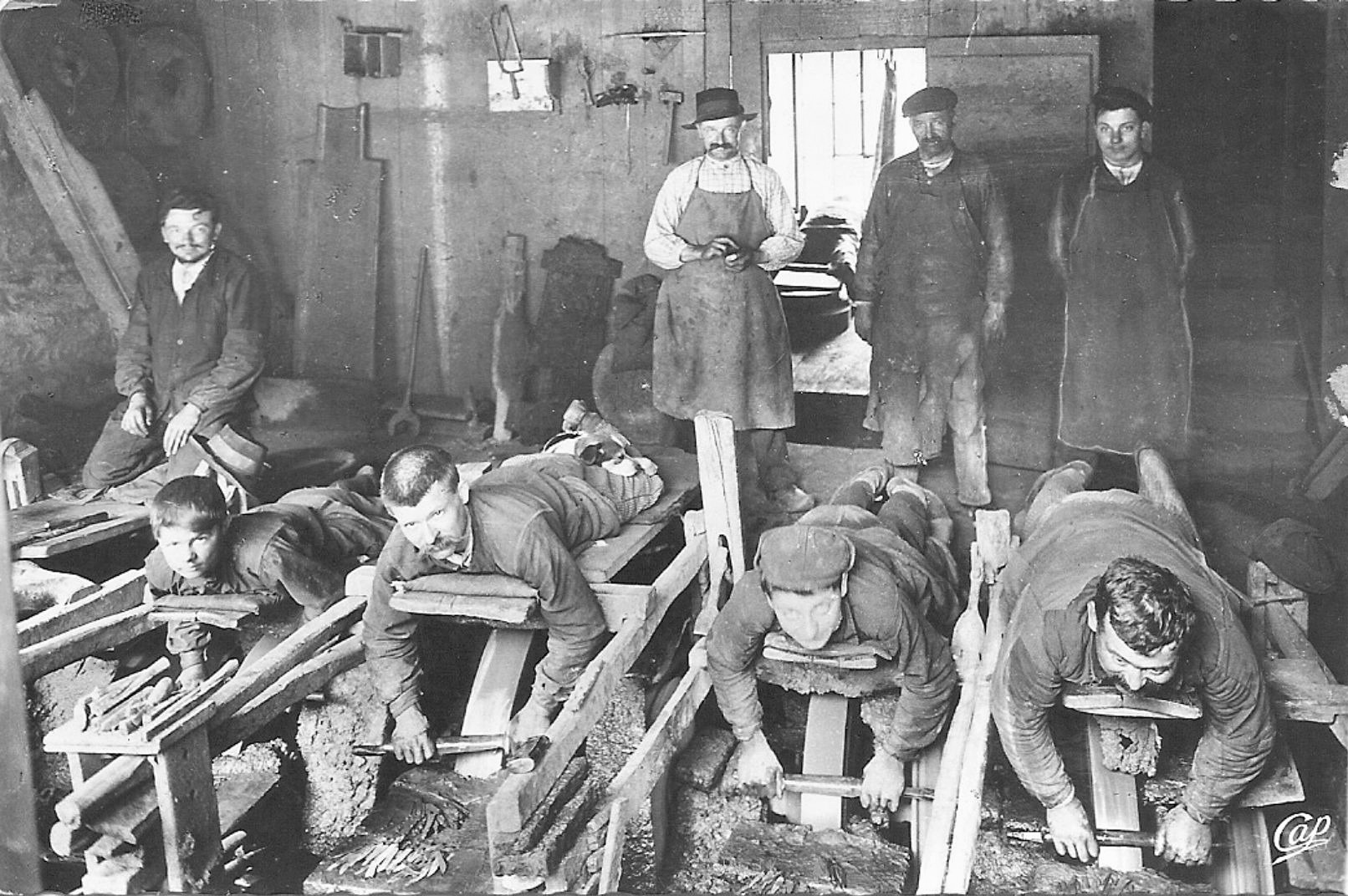
The Thiers grinders in the early 20th century.

The hydraulic power of the Durolle River has been used in Thiers since the Middle Ages to power flour mills, tanners' fulling machines, papermakers' mallets and, with the development of the knife making industry, smelters' hammers and grinders. By the 15th century, a quarter of the population of Thiers was working as cutlers. Items produced in the valley were exported to several countries in the 17th century, including Spain, Italy, Germany, Turkey and the Indies. (Note: In his 1788 book Voyage en Auvergne, Legrand d'Aussy noted that industrialists from Thiers were effectively countering English industrialists as far afield as India.)

=== Industrial revolution ===
From 1850 onwards, the knife making industry was the only one to survive, with the introduction of machines heralding the advent of large-scale manufacturing. At that time, the knife making industry was particularly organized. The manpower needed to make a knife was scattered throughout the city; there was an extreme division of labor, with workers specializing in a trade, handed down from father to son, in which they acquired great dexterity. The steel bars received by the companies were first passed on to the "hammermakers", who thinned them (so that they could be sharpened) using hammers powered by the river's hydraulic force. The blacksmiths then received these bars, with which they forged the knife parts. These pieces were then sent to filers, drillers, grinders and polishers, who sharpened and polished the blades on grinding wheels driven by the Durolle. The manufacturer himself then tempered the blades, and after the sealer had delivered the handles, all the parts were finally handed over to the assemblers, who lived in the faubourgs of Thiers. This organization of production was characterized by the widespread dispersal of workplaces in the Thiers region, and particularly in the valley.

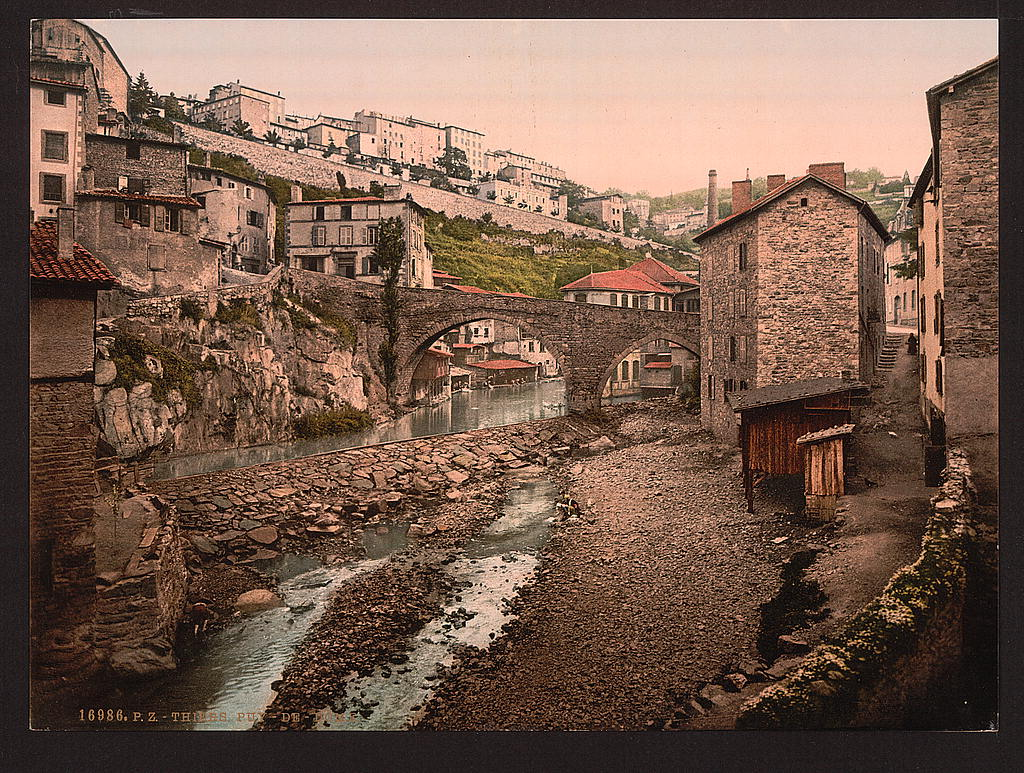
The northern part of the Vallée des Usines in the early 20th century.

At the end of the 19th century, foreign competition prompted Thiernois industries to modernize. This modernization involved electrification, and a new type of factory was created, integrating all knife making operations. Paper mills that were unwilling to adopt these modern production techniques were forced to close their operations; by 1860, there were only around twenty of them left.

=== The early 20th century ===
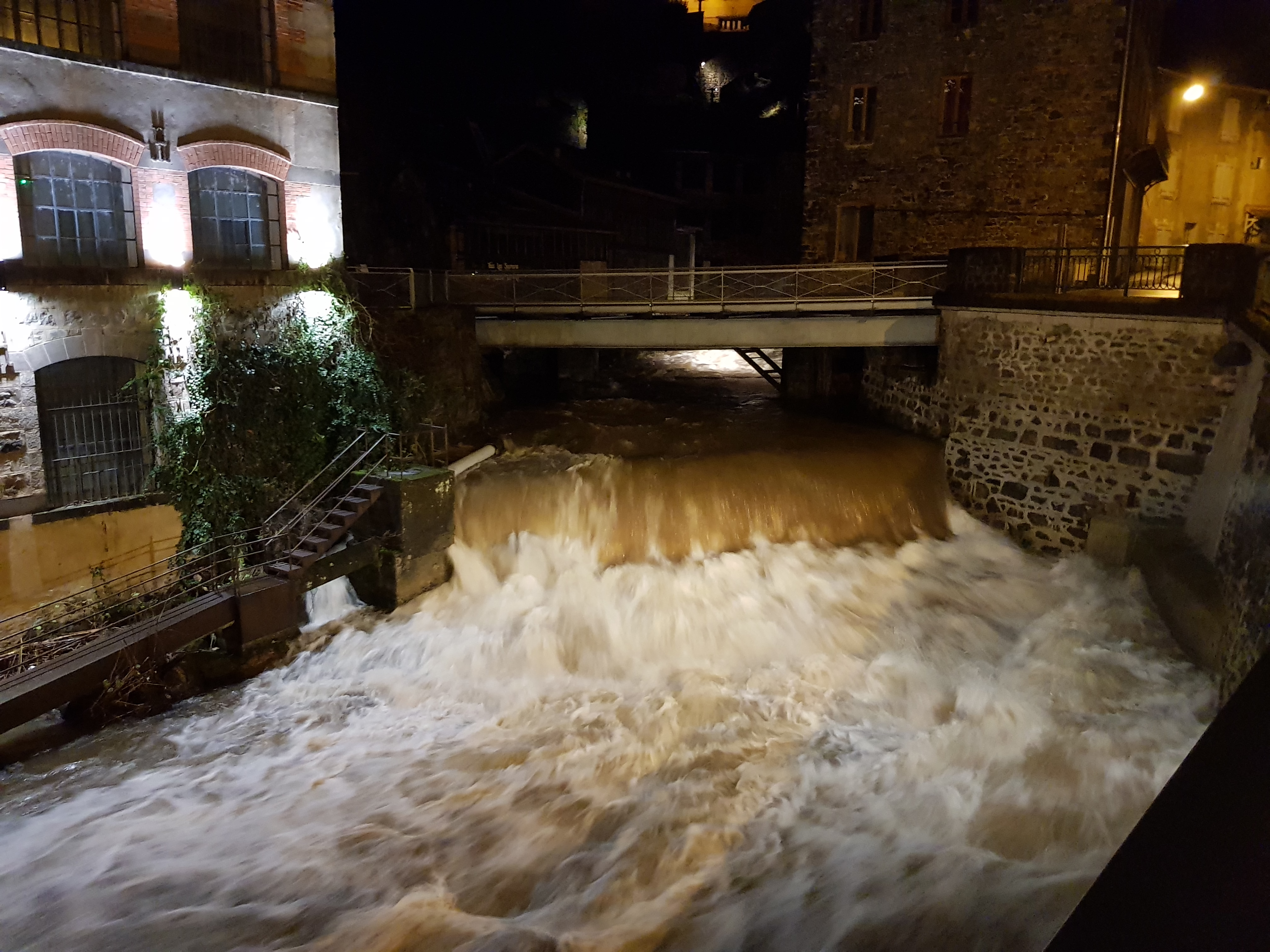
The Durolle River in flood in January 2018.

At the beginning of the 20th century, there were a growing number of problems concerning the water of the Durolle. Firstly, the river's summer flow remained very low and irregular, leading to relative unemployment. Indeed, the factories that used the river's motive power were unable to operate without a sufficient flow of water. In winter, the phenomenon reversed, and the winter Durolle turned into a torrent in flood with considerable force. The town of Thiers is one of the most vulnerable to flooding in the Puy-de-Dôme department, and the Vallée des Usines is the area of the town most affected by such events.

To avoid dependence on the whims of the Durolle, the factories began using electric power in 1903. In 1920, the Durolle provided an average of 1,000 horsepower per day, compared with 1,500 horsepower for electric power.

The average daily output of electric motive power was as follows:

| year | power in hp |
|---|---|
| 1903 | 170 ▲ |
| 1908 | 803 ▲ |
| 1914 | 1,123 ▲ |
| 1920 | 1,500 ▲ |

The factories' independence from the Durolle enabled them to become "complete factories". In 1912, the Durolle valley was home to over 12,000 workers and 550 manufacturers. During this period, the Thiers area was France's biggest producer of knives and tools with blades, far ahead of Châtellerault, Nogent and Paris, and equal with Sheffield in the UK. From 1912 onwards, production was subject to numerous fluctuations:

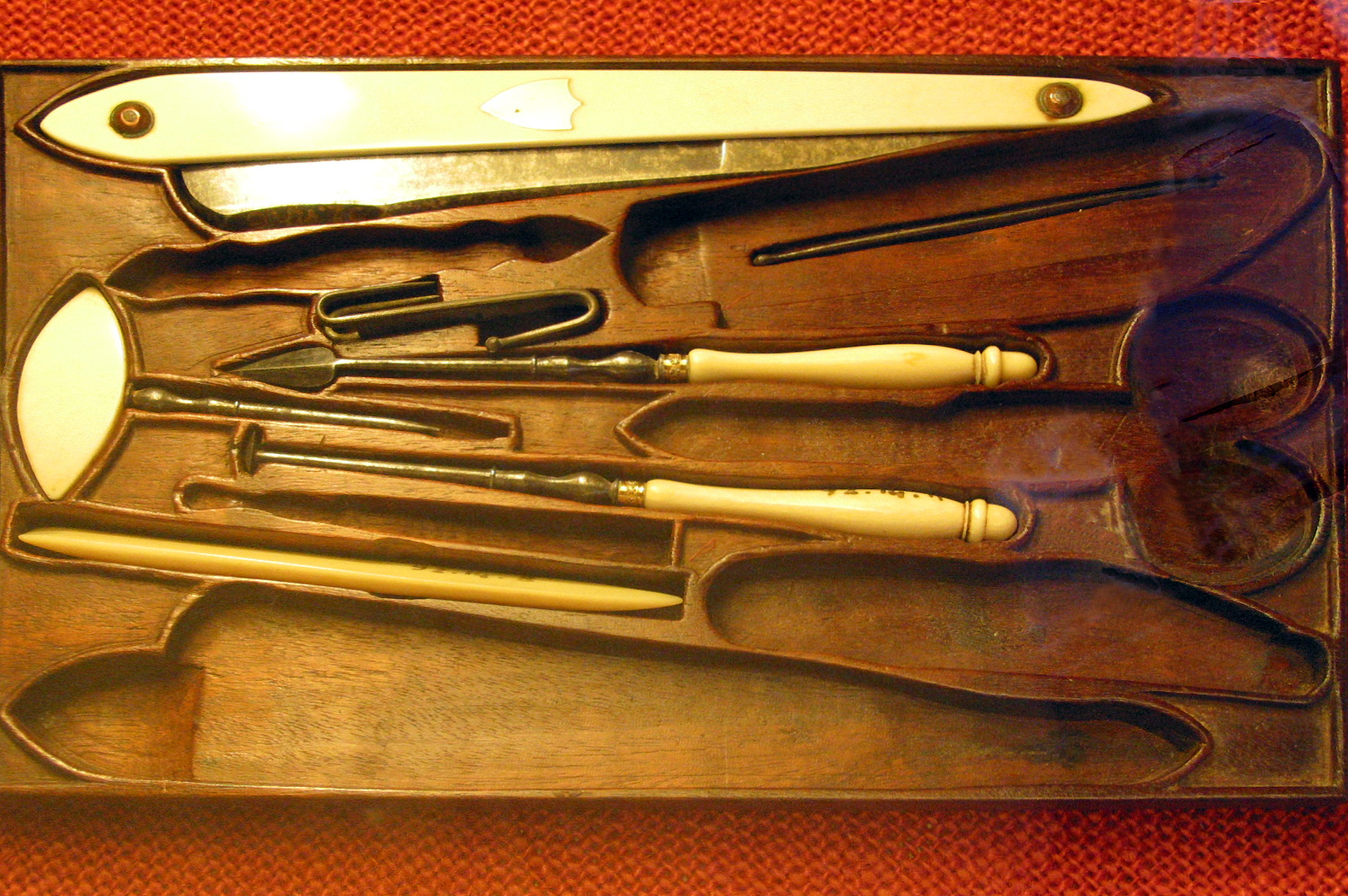
Barber's kit on display at the Cutlery Museum.

| year | production in tons |
|---|---|
| 1912 | 3 108 t ▲ |
| 1918 | 1 210 t ▼ |
| 1920 | 2 618 t ▲ |

=== After World War II ===
At the end of World War II, during the post-war reconstruction period, the valley saw a proliferation of small businesses. Workers set up on their own, creating a multitude of very modest businesses. The valley's large factories were thus accompanied by micro-enterprises employing a small number of workers. In the latter, the workforce remained essentially family-based. The bosses worked in the same way as the workers on the shop floor, while the women generally took care of accounting and secretarial duties.

In these small businesses, the interaction between workers and bosses was often characterized by informality, a symbol of a good relationship between them.

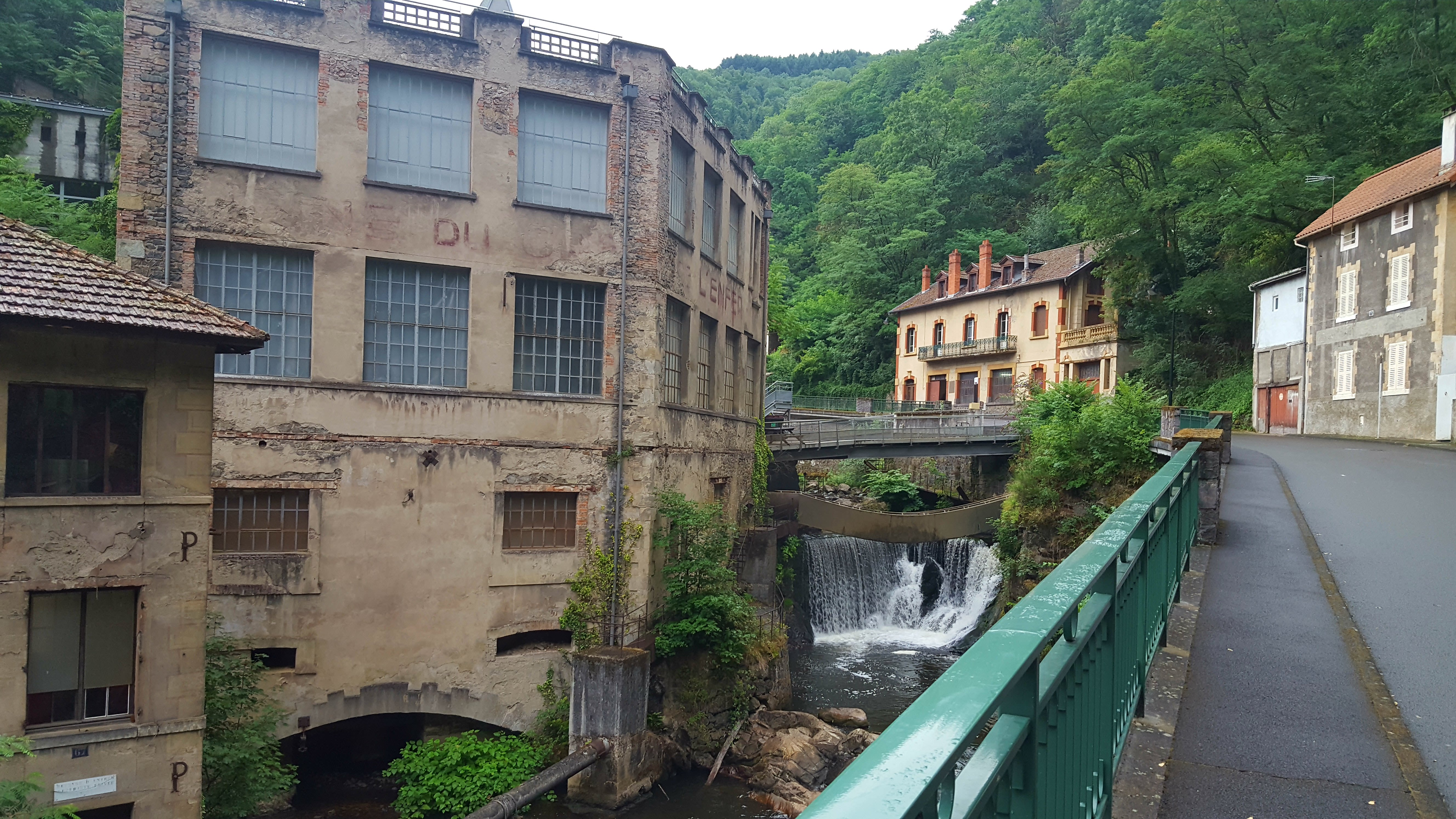
The former Creux de l'Enfer factory, transformed into a contemporary art center.

=== From the second half of the 20th century ===
From the second half of the 20th century onwards, knife making factories were once again modernized, and the Durolle was no longer used as a source of energy, having been replaced by electricity. From the 1960s onwards, companies left the valley for industrial estates. Today, the valley is littered with industrial wastelands. Some have been converted into museums or contemporary art centers, such as the May factory and the Creux de l'Enfer factory. Others, like the Ferrier factory, have been abandoned.

In 2021, a knife making company announced that it would be moving from its current premises outside Thiers town center to the Vallée des Usines. In October 2021, modernization work began on a former factory. Other private projects are taking place, notably in the field of culture in the former Croix de fer factory.

=== Protection ===
The Vallée des Usines is partially protected by Thiers' Plan de sauvegarde et de mise en valeur (preservation and enhancement plan) of December 1980, covering only the western part of the valley. It is also protected by the town's Plan General de Ordenación Urbana (General Urban Development Plan).

The valley also boasts a number of buildings protected as monuments historiques. These include the May factory, the Forges Mondière, the Seychalles bridge plant, the Saint-Jean de Thiers church and the Moutier abbey.

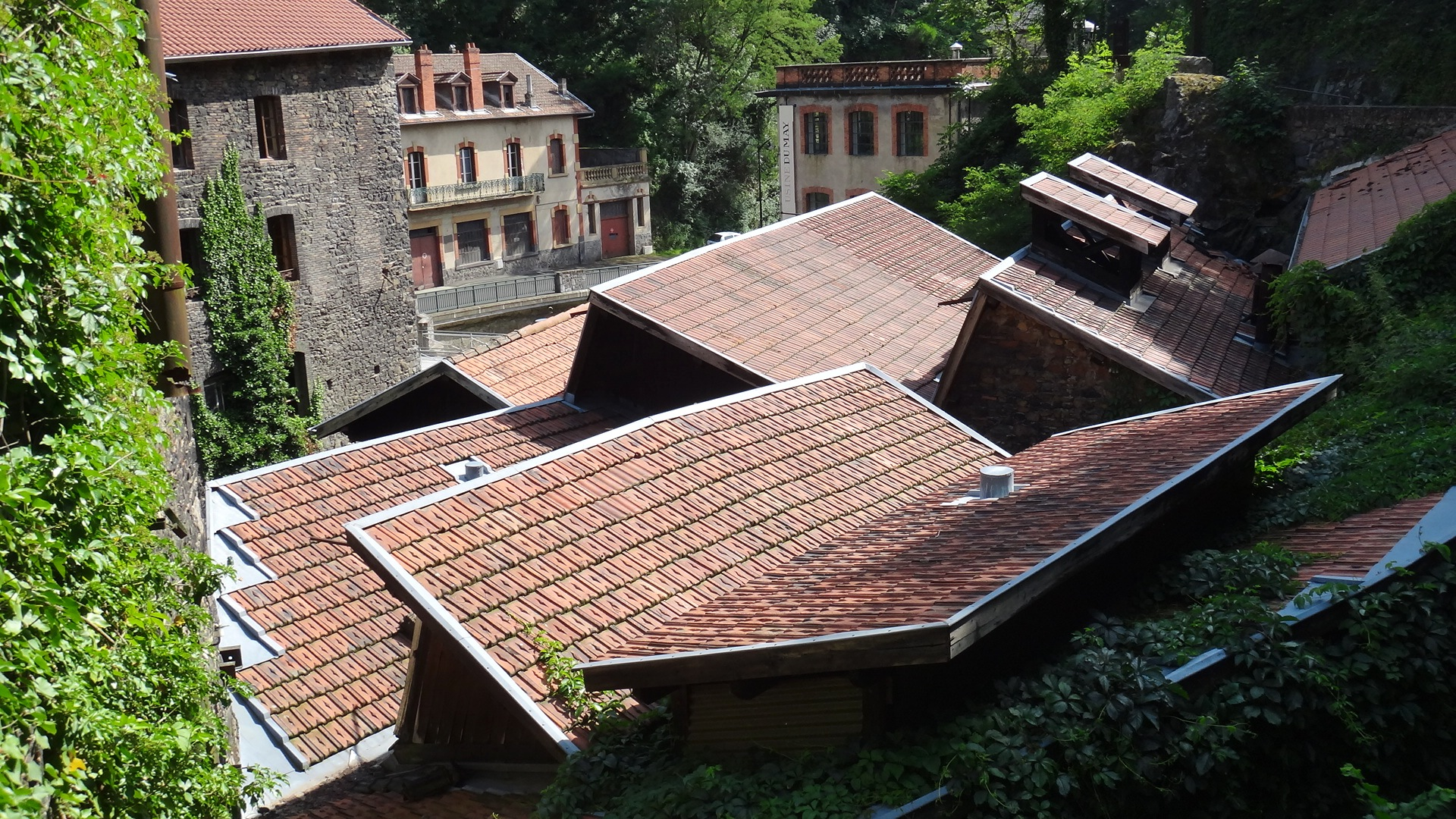
The Forges Mondière

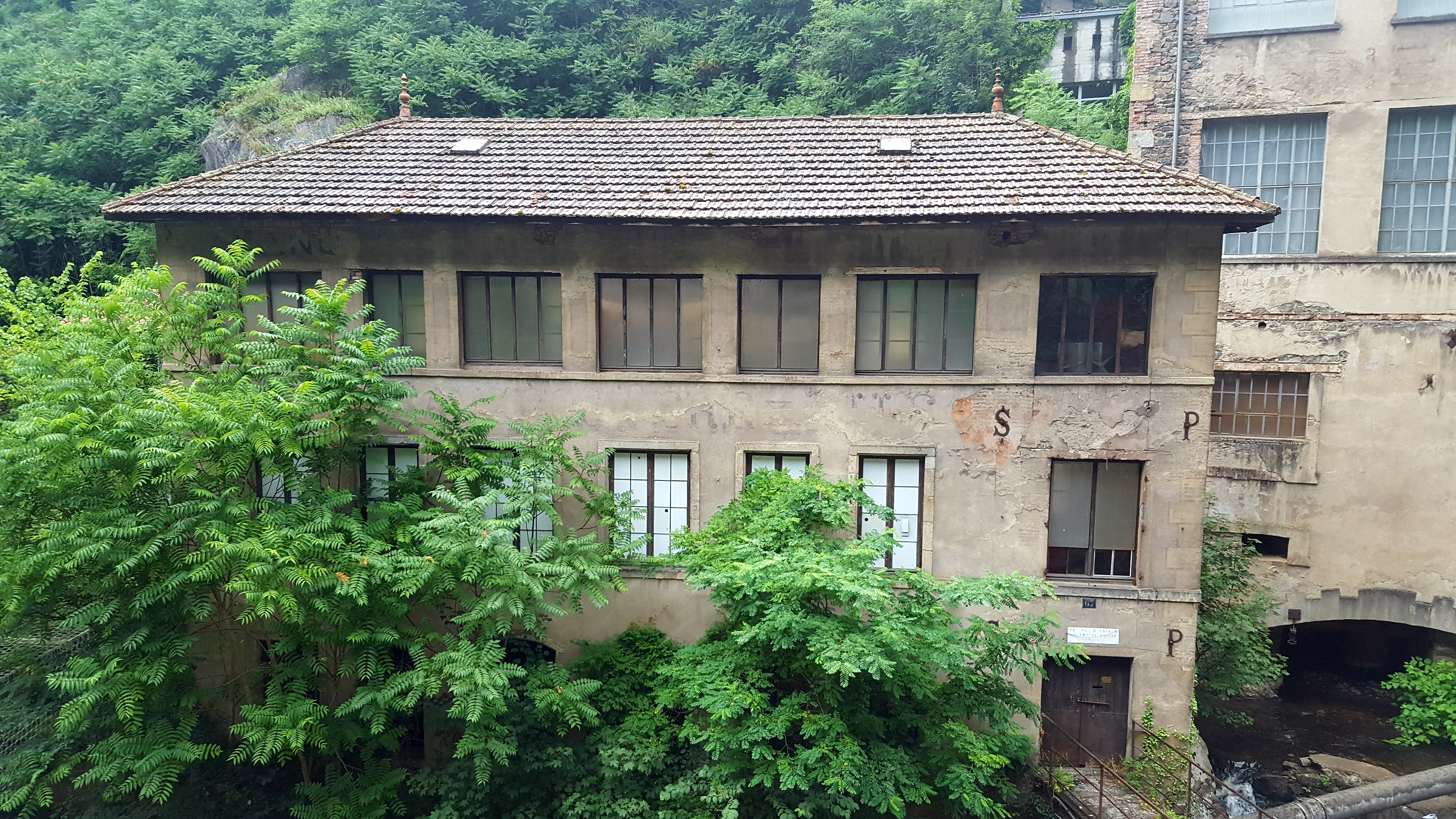
The Entraygues plant.

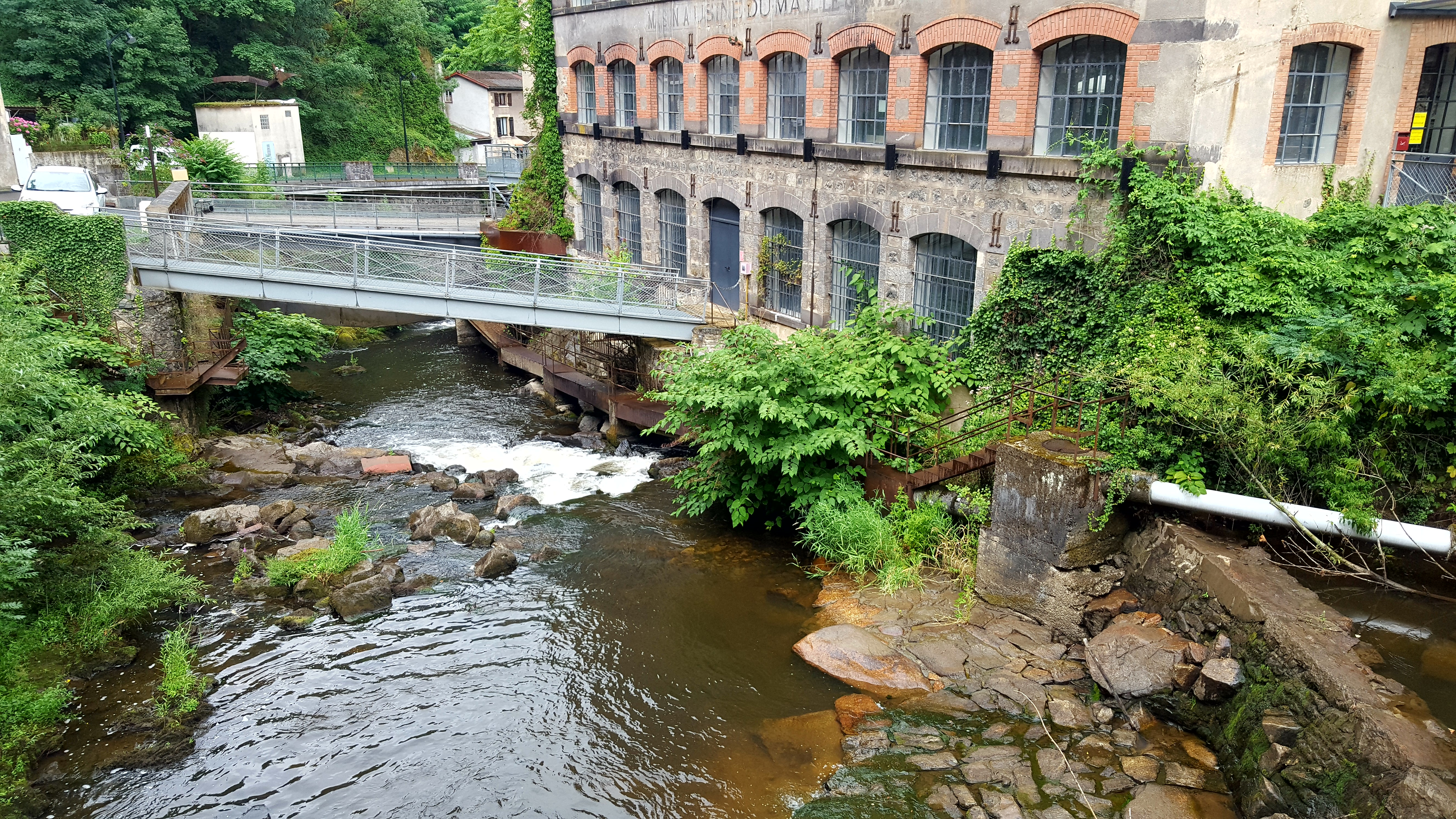
The May Factory

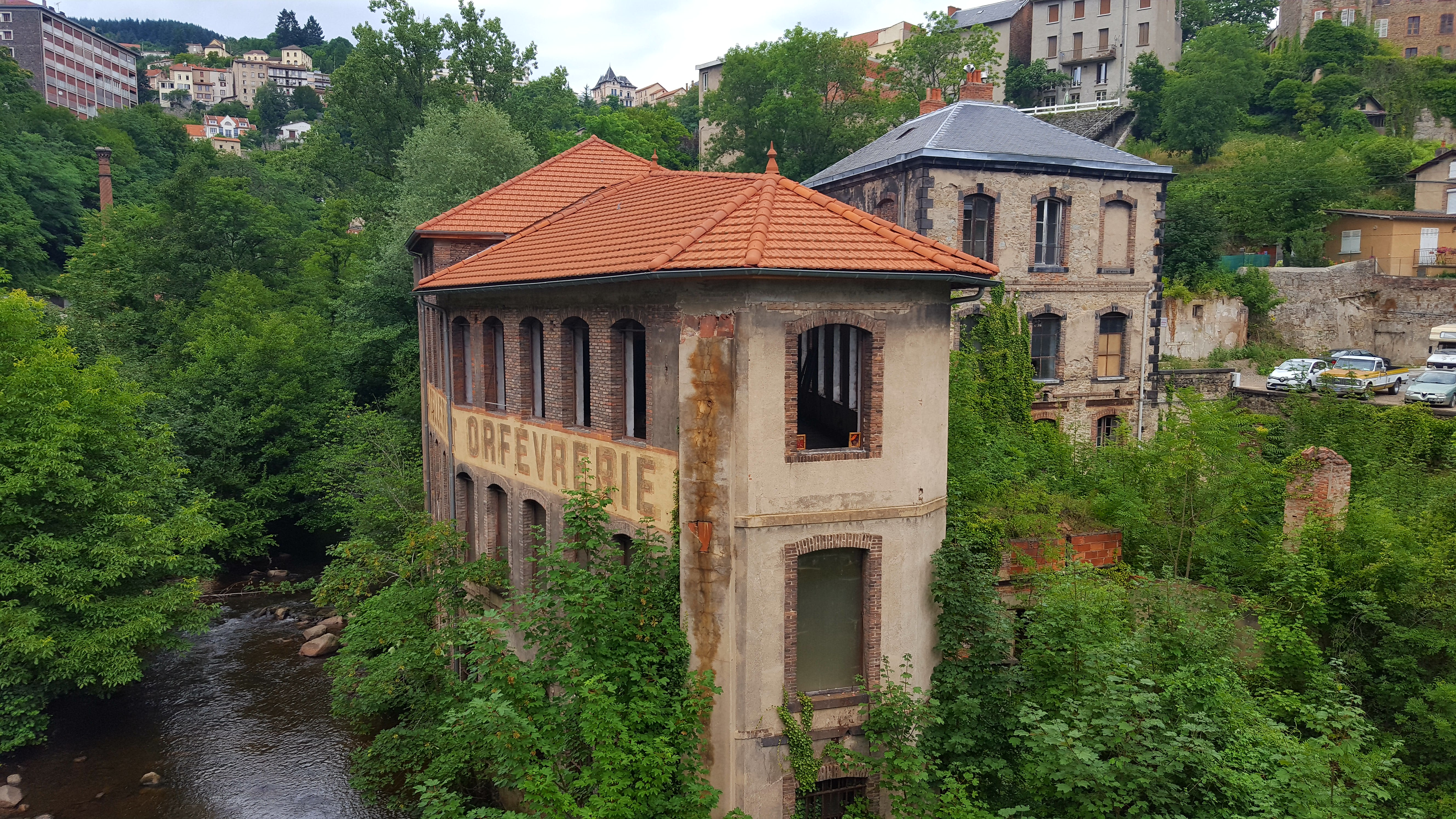
The Seychalles bridge plant

Several plants are listed on the general inventory of cultural heritage:

| Knife making | Paper mill |
|---|---|
| Courby Joubert plant; Sauzedde Néron plant; Boulai plant; Desgouttes factory; Douris Bernichon factory; Mondière forges; Ferrier machining plant; Creux-de-l'enfer factory; May factory; Entraygues plant; pont-de-Seychalles factory; Dozolme Mallard knife making plant; Chassaigne knife making plant; Sabatier knife making plant; Marchepoil knife making plant; Delaire knife making plant; Riberolles knife making plant; Dessapt knife making plant | Andrieux Dufour mill; Malmenayde Fenerol paper mill; Boyer mill; Bouchet Malmenaide paper mill; Lacroix Mary mill; Bouchet Chassaigne mill; Navarron mill |

== Tourism ==
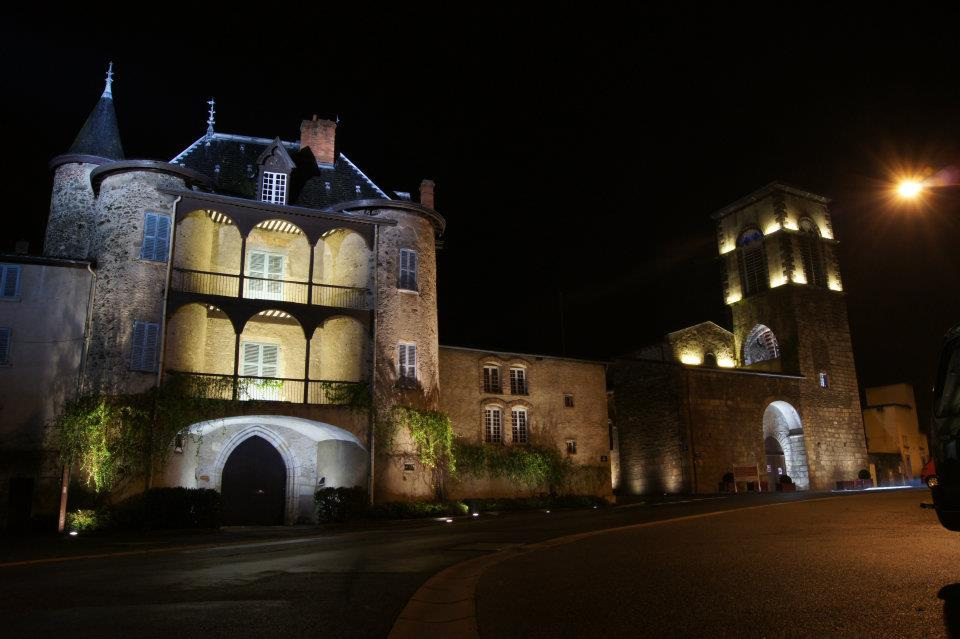
The Moutier abbey dwelling at night in 2012.

=== Ecotourism ===
Marked hiking trails wind through the valley, allowing hikers to discover a landscape of valleys and volcanic peaks. Trout fishing is also practiced here, as this part of the Durolle valley is recognized as a street fishing site, i.e. a place where fishing is practiced in town.

=== Cultural tourism ===
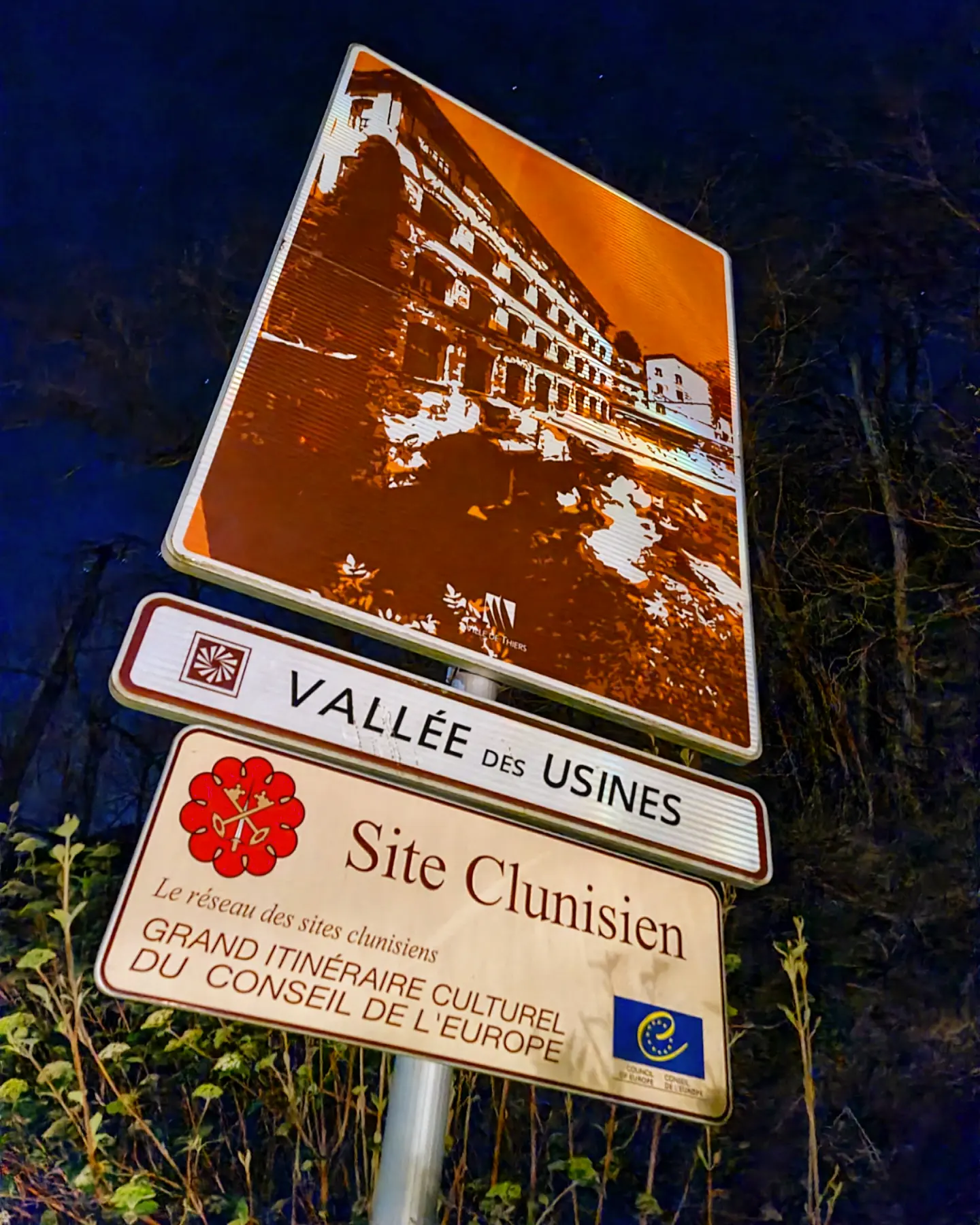
One of the signs at the entrance to the town of Thiers, referring to the Vallée des Usines.

The Vallée des Usines is one of Thiers' most popular tourist attractions. The valley has also been awarded a two-star rating by the Michelin Guide vert, with the words "Worth a detour".

The gardens of the old hospital, restored in 2007, are remarkable for their terraced layout and the views they offer over the Vallée des Usines. The Creux de l'Enfer contemporary art center is a venue for artistic productions, with exhibition programs including sculptures, installations, paintings, photographs, videos and performances, playing an active role in the cultural life of the town, the Puy-de-Dôme department and the Auvergne-Rhône-Alpes region, and working to raise artistic awareness with over two thousand school visitors every year. The May factory is a space dedicated to culture, for temporary exhibitions, artist residencies, special events and educational support. The Moutier abbey residence, comprising the abbey of the same name and the Saint-Symphorien church, dates back to the 11th century. The abbey can be visited from July 1 to August 31, while the church is open to the public all year round.

=== Promotion and enhancement project ===
The newly elected municipality of Thiers in 2020, aware of the great potential of the Vallée des Usines on many levels (particularly economic and cultural), decided to imagine a sound and light festival that would take place in the industrial setting of the site. A large stage was first announced near the Creux de l'Enfer contemporary art center, to take advantage of the latter's large facades as well as those of the May factory.

At the same time, the town was undertaking a number of other projects in the Valley: renovation of the forges Mondière in conjunction with the Fondation du patrimoine and the Michelin Foundation based in nearby Clermont-Ferrand, renovation of the forecourt of the Seychalles bridge plant (known as "Le Paquebot") and of the historic building in conjunction with the Stéphane Bern Mission and the Loto du patrimoine, and renovation and extension of the Creux de l'enfer contemporary art center.

In 2021, a knife making company announced it would be moving from its current premises outside downtown Thiers to the Vallée des Usines. In October 2021, modernization work began on a former factory. Other private projects are taking place, notably in the field of culture in the former "Croix de fer" factory.

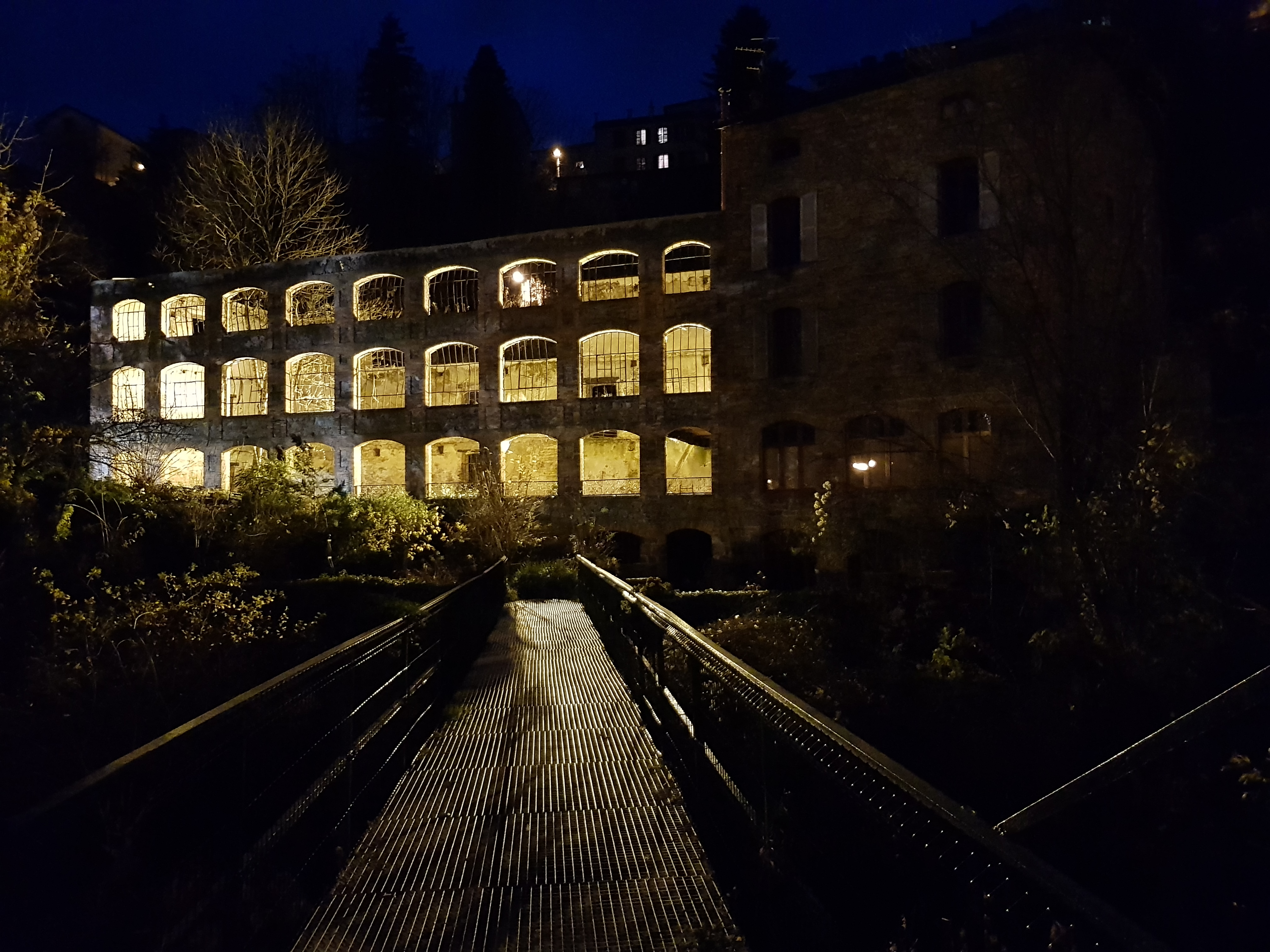
Illuminated former knife making workshops at Faux-Martel.

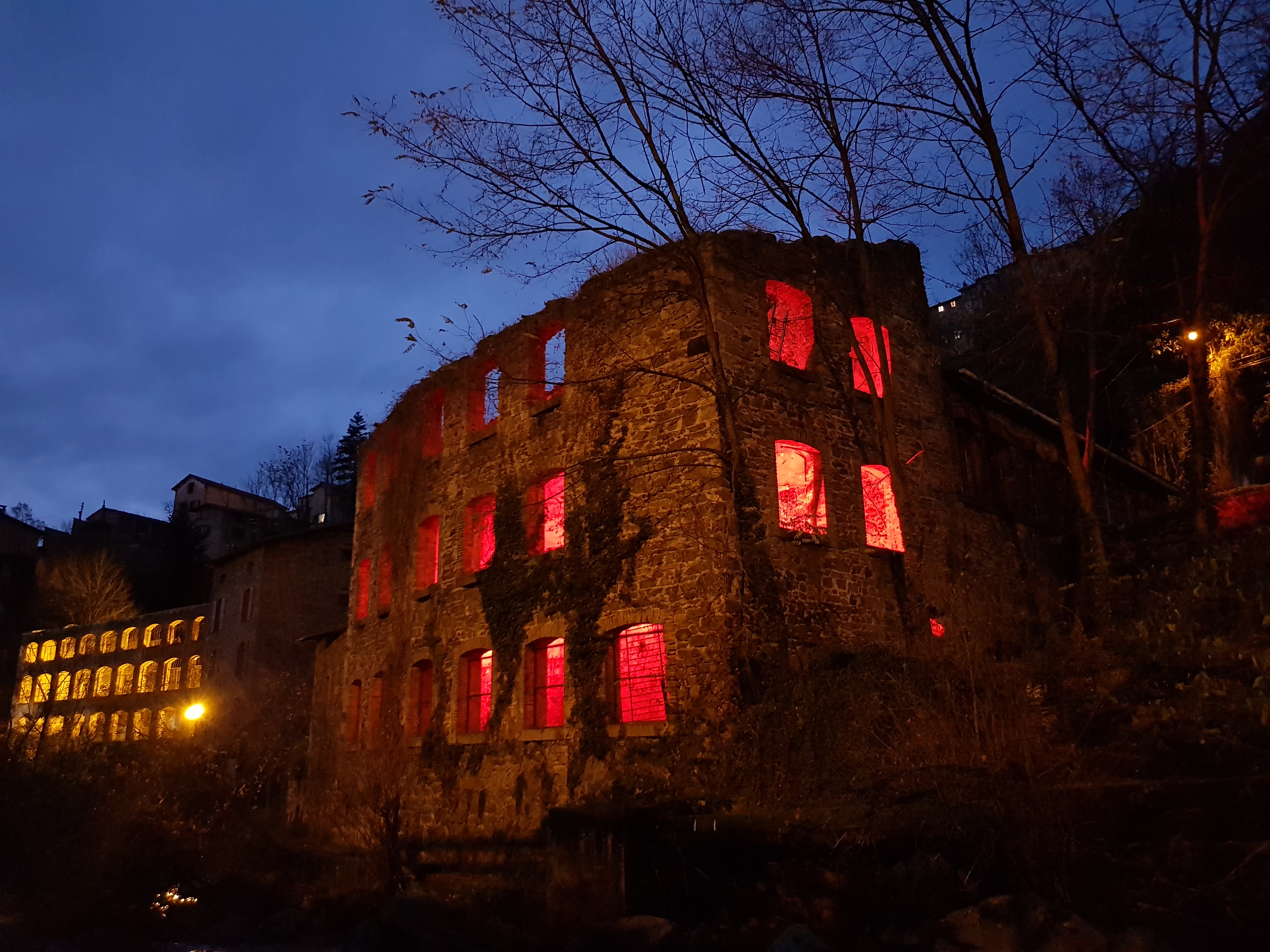
Ancient knife making workshops illuminated.

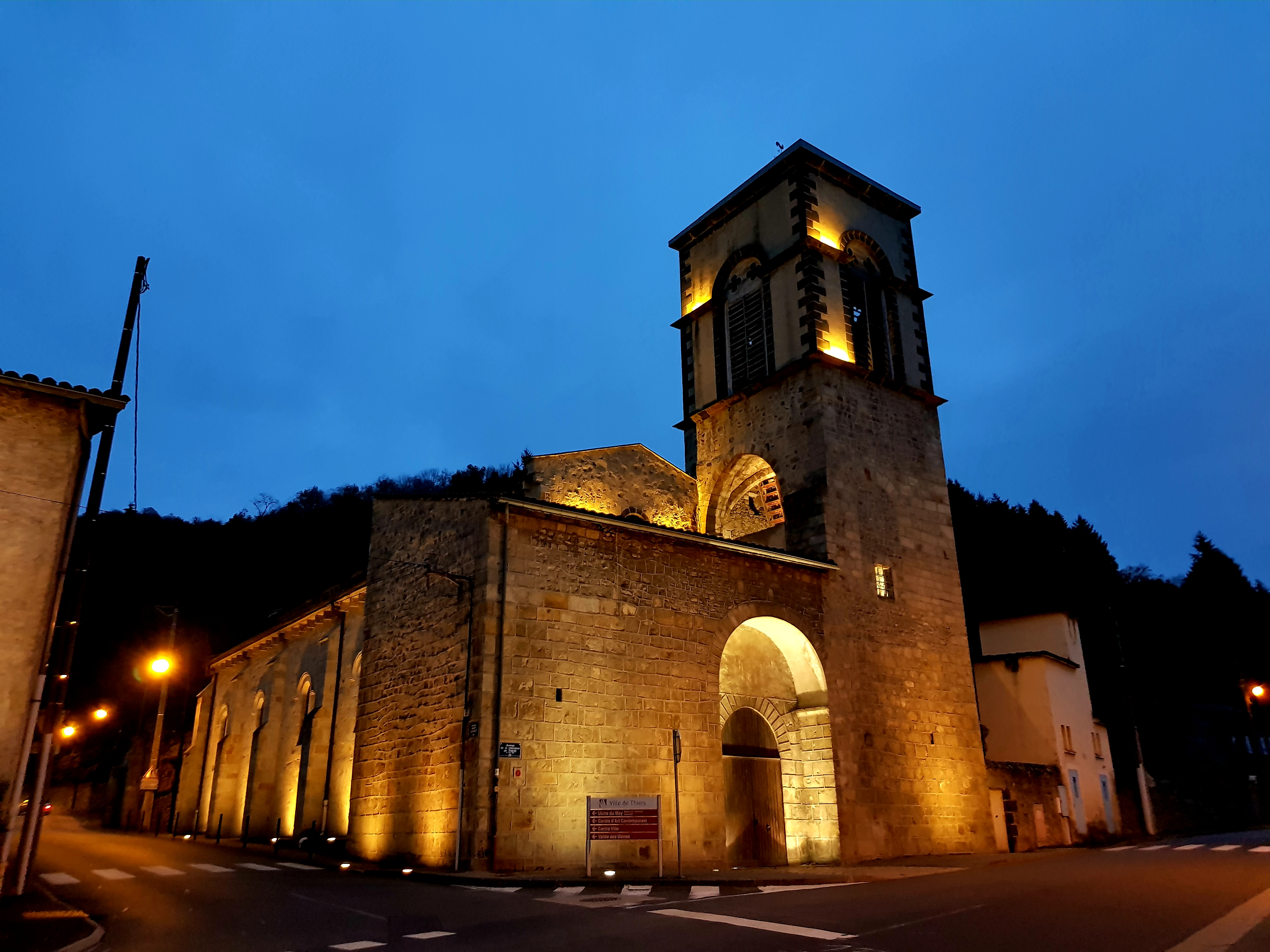
Saint-Symphorien du Moûtier church at the southern entrance to the valley.

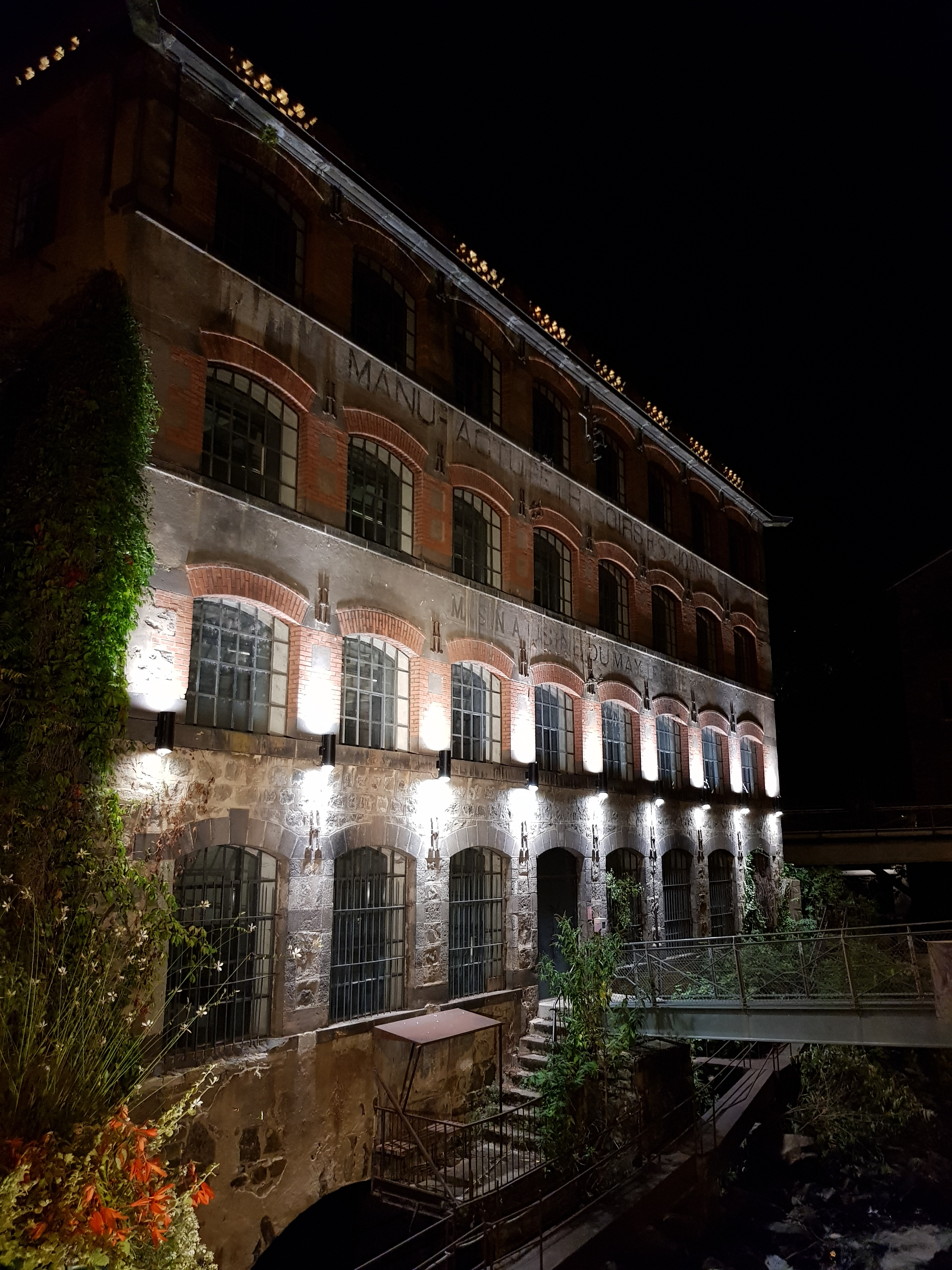
Main facade of the May factory.

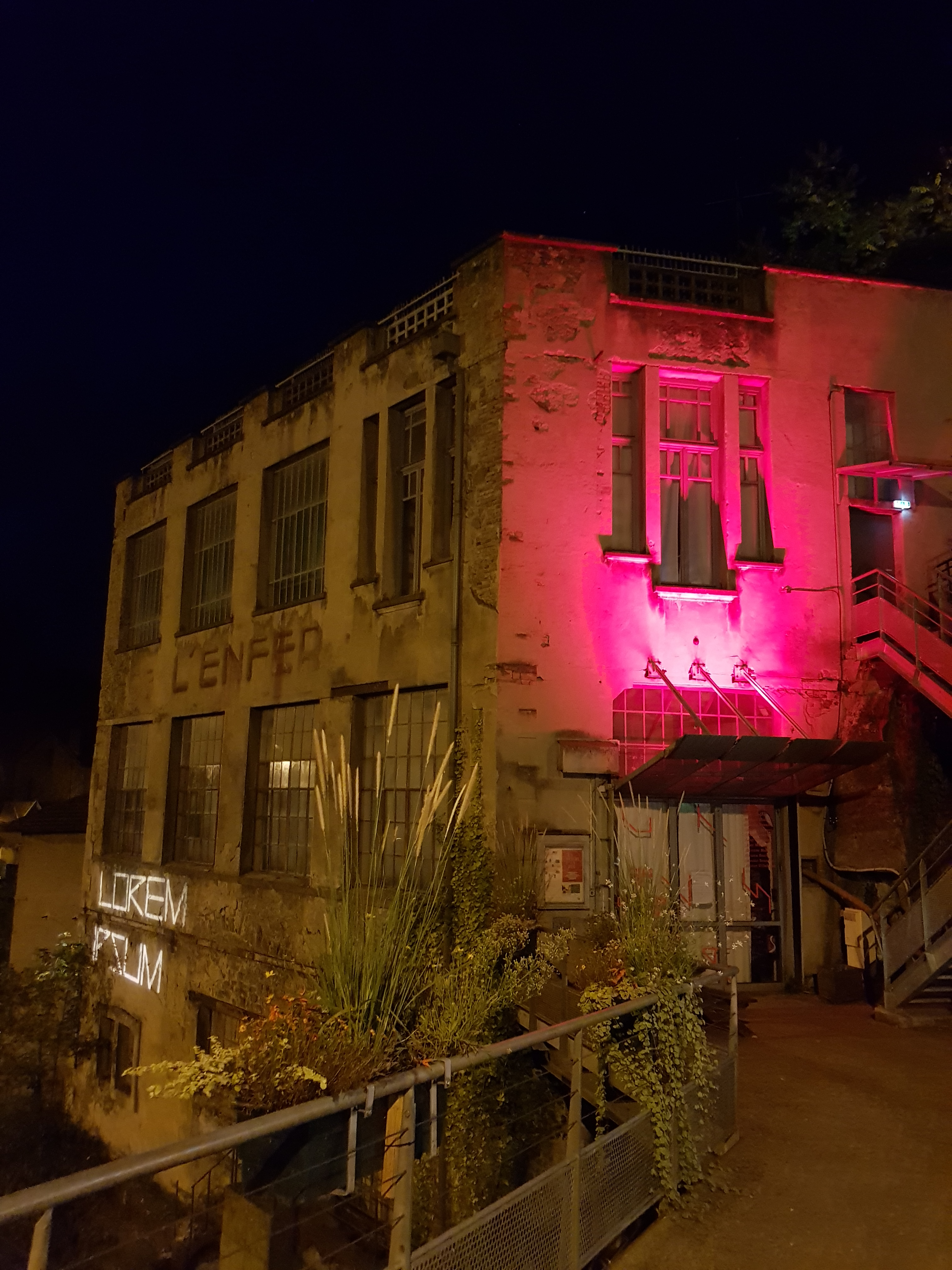
Entrance to the Creux de l'enfer art center.

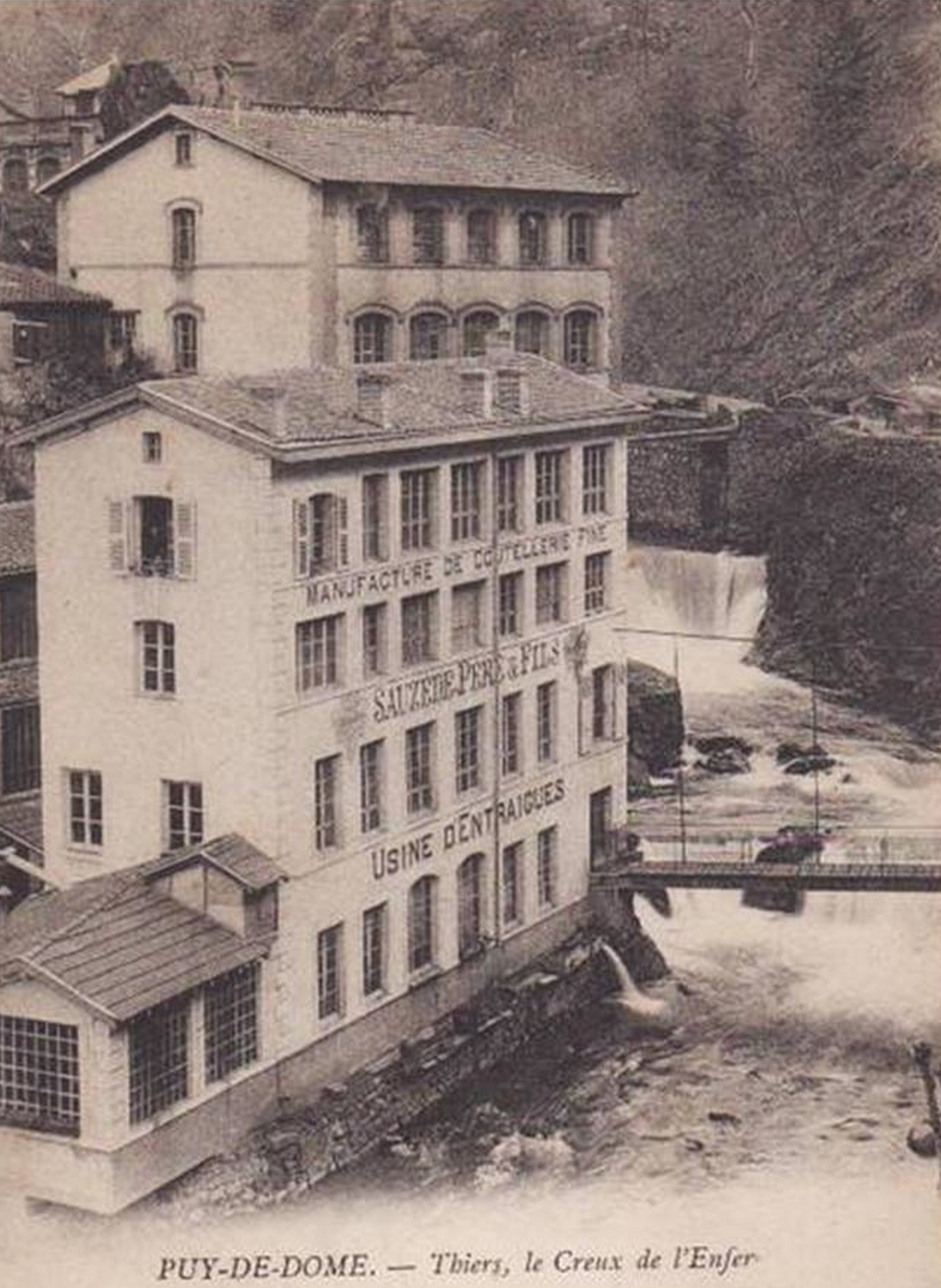
The center of the valley in 1930.

== Actions ==
=== Watercourse maintenance ===
Several structures in the Durolle riverbed have been rehabilitated in recent years. In 2017, for example, the Puy-de-Dôme General Council launched a project to repair a scour on the Avenue Joseph-Claussat retaining wall. Repairs to the Ferrier bridge, in the heart of the valley, were also planned for 2018.

In 2018, the municipality of Thiers carried out a number of large-scale actions to maintain the valley. These included combating the proliferation of ragweed, and helping to maintain, mark out and ensure the safety of the valley's hiking trails.

=== Plant and building maintenance ===
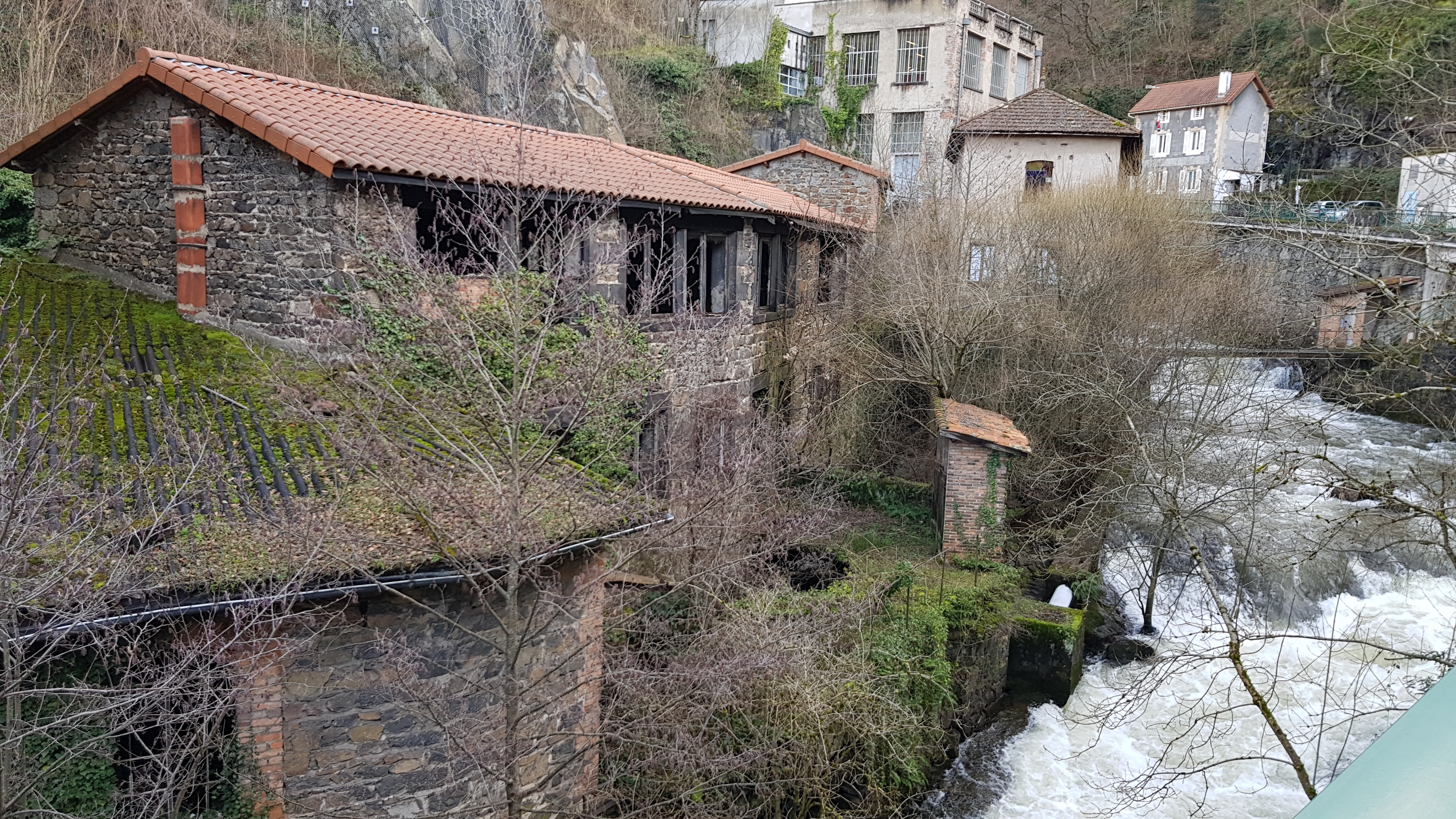
A former knife making factory put "out of water" in 2018.

From the late 2000s onwards, many buildings have been "de-watered" to preserve the valley's historic heritage. Hiking trails have been created, factories rehabilitated (e.g. the May factory), several bridges reassigned and cliffs secured against rock falls. To highlight the valley's factories, a lighting system was installed in 2009. Spotlights illuminate buildings such as the Creux-de-l'Enfer, the cliffs overlooking the valley and the Durolle riverbed.

In early 2021, the town of Thiers embarked on a plan to clear and enhance the factory valley. In January, the area between "Bout du monde" and "Vallée des rouets" was cleared.

== See also ==
- Thiers, Puy-de-Dôme
- Thiers old hospital
- Durolle
- Vallée des Rouets
- Forges Mondière
- Cutlery of Thiers

== Bibliography ==
- Lefebvre, Magali; Chabanne, Jérôme; Cutlery Museum (2005). Vallée des usines [Valley of Factories] (in French). Thiers: Ville de Thiers. ISBN 978-2-35145-008-6.
- Auzias, Dominique; Labourdette, Jean-Paul (2018). Petit Futé Clermont-Ferrand 2018 (in French). Clermont-Ferrand: Petit Futé. ISBN 979-10-331-7534-6.
- Simon, Anthony (2002). La pluriactivité dans l'agriculture des montagnes françaises: un territoire, des hommes, une pratique [Pluriactivity in French mountain agriculture: a territory, men, a practice] (in French). Clermont-Ferrand: Presses Univ Blaise Pascal. ISBN 978-2-84516-192-4.
- Hadjadj, Dany (1999). Pays de Thiers: le regard et la mémoire [Pays de Thiers: a look at the past] (in French). Thiers et sa région: Presses Univ Blaise Pascal. ISBN 978-2-84516-116-0.
- Drillon, Caroline; Ricard, Marie-Claire (2012). L'Auvergne Pour les Nuls [Auvergne For Dummies] (in French). Auvergne: edi8. ISBN 978-2-7540-4485-1.
- Combe, Paul (1956). Thiers : les origines, l'évolution des industries thiernoises, leur avenir [Thiers: the origins, development and future of Thiers' industries] (in French). Thiers: G. de Bussac.
- Nadeau, Louis (1862). Voyage en Auvergne [Journey to Auvergne]. Auvergne: E. Dentu. p. 180.
- Combe, Paul (1922). Thiers et la vallée industrielle de la Durolle [Thiers and the industrial Durolle valley] (in French). Thiers: Armand Colin.
- Henry, Anne (2005). Un site urbain façonné par l'industrie: Thiers, ville coutelière [An urban site shaped by industry: Thiers, knife making town] (in French). Thiers: Ville de Thiers.

=== Filmography ===
- L'Argent de poche, a film by François Truffaut, Thiers, 1976.
- La Ville Noire, adaptation of the novel of the same name by George Sand, Thiers, 1985.
