= Creux de l'Enfer =

French art gallery

Coordinates: 45.85°N 3.55°E

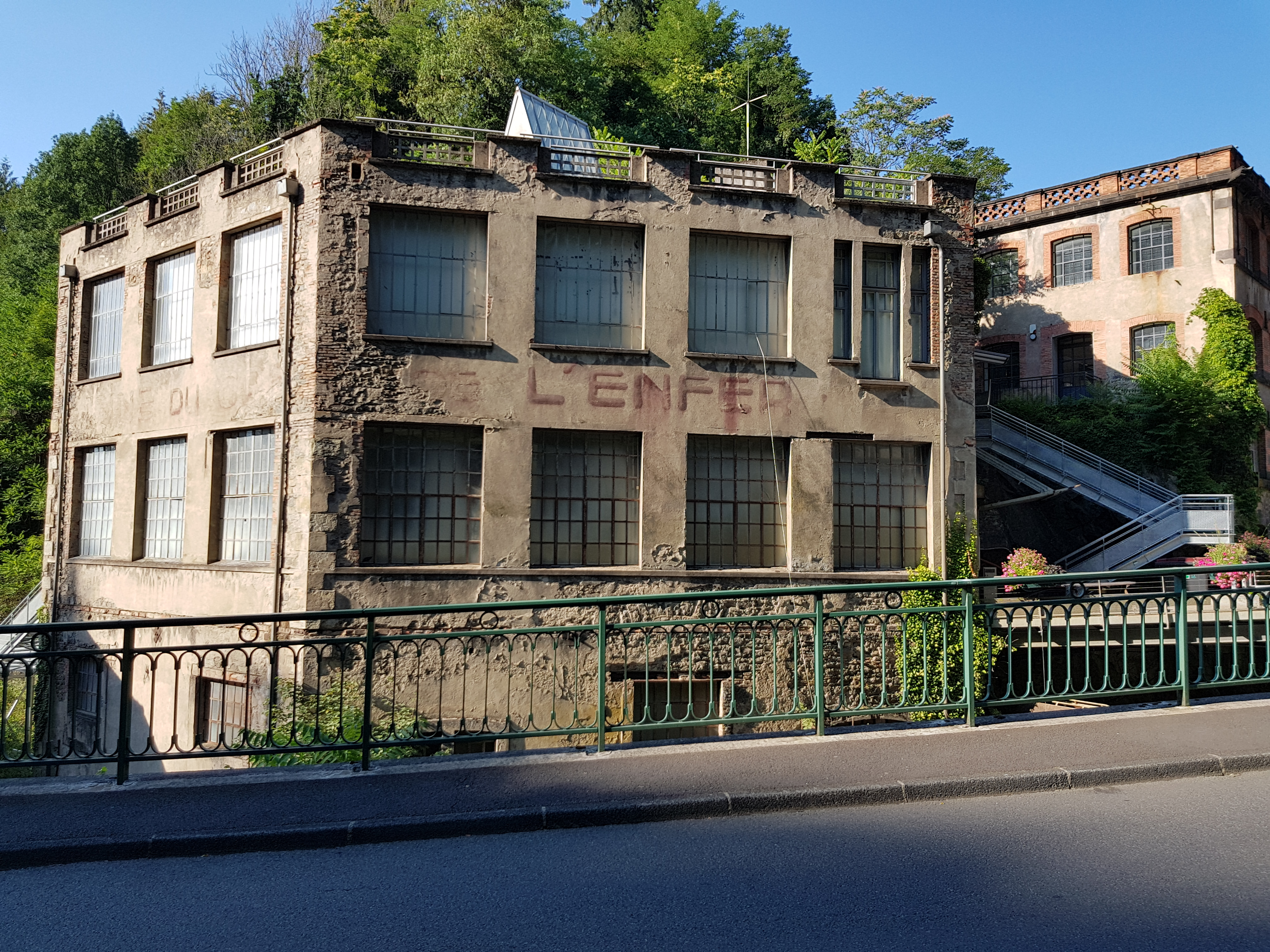
Le Creux de l'Enfer, Thiers, France

The Creux de l'Enfer is a contemporary art center located in Thiers' Vallée des Usines, France. It opened in 1988 in a former cutlery factory which closed in 1956.

The art center was directed by Laurence Gateau from 1988 to 1999, by Frédéric Bouglé from 1999 to 2018, and since 2018 by Sophie Auger-Grappin. It offers a varied and multidisciplinary quarterly program. The exhibitions present sculpture, photography, painting as well as video installations.

== Selected exhibitions ==
- Mona Hatoum (26 September 1999 - 2 January 2000)
- Erró (8 June - 14 September 2003)
- Tadashi Kawamata (25 June - 25 September 2005)
- Thomas Hirschhorn, Concretion (1 July - 24 September 2006)
- Mounir Fatmi, Fuck Architects (4 June - 14 September 2008)
- Claude Closky, Illumination (15 October 2008 - 31 January 2009)
- Georges Rousse (4 June - 14 September 2014)
- Claire Tabouret, Neptune (28 June - 17 September 2017)
- Le Génie du lieu with Jennifer Caubet, Elsa Werth, Sylvain Grout & Yann Mazéas, Hélène Bertin, Flora Moscovici, Anne-Laure Sacriste (27 October 2018 - 17 February 2019)
