= Vallée des Rouets =

Valley in France

- Valley of Mills
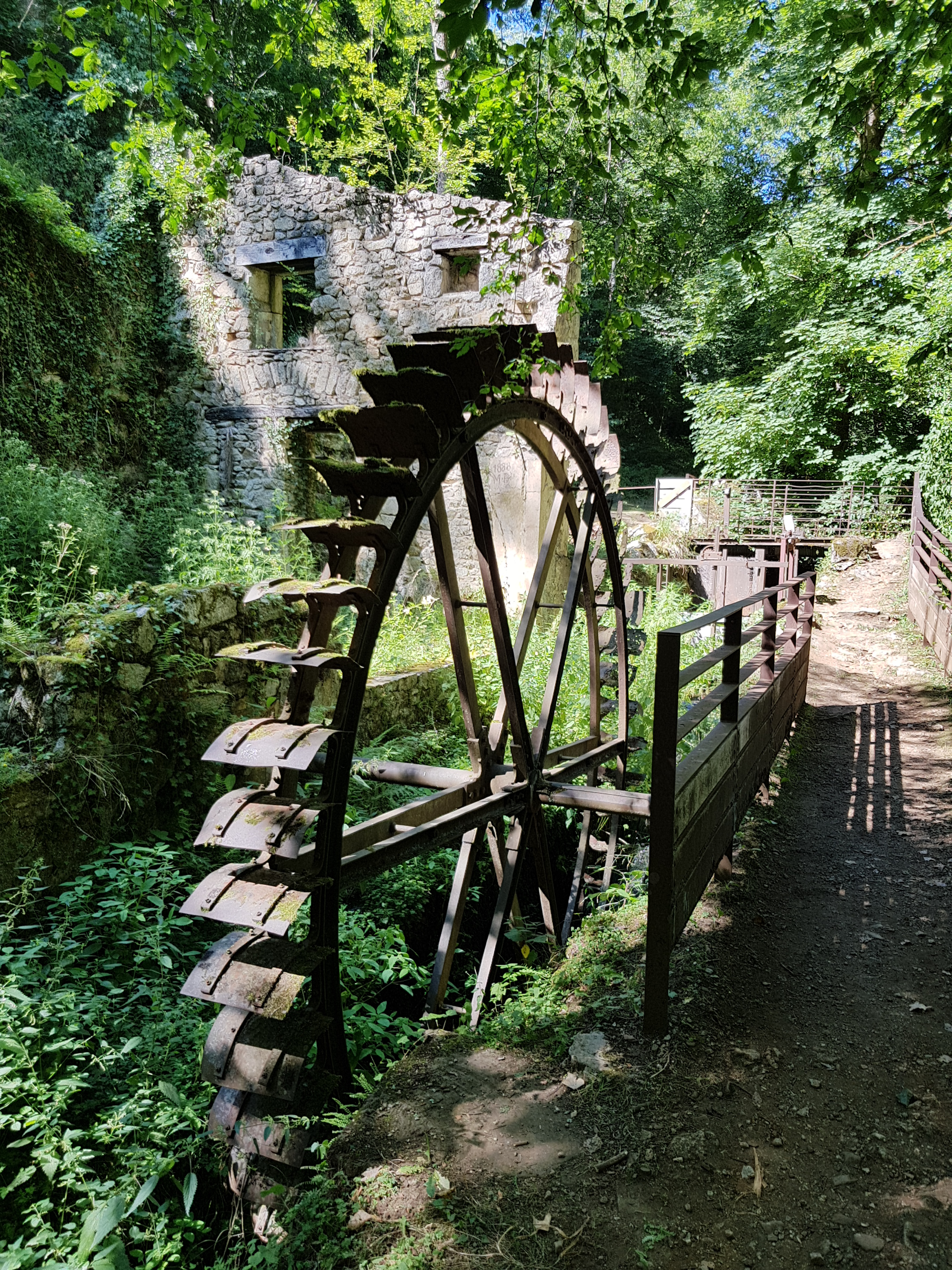
- An old mill with a water wheel preserved near the tourist route.

- Location within Auvergne-Rhône-Alpes
- Length: 2,000 m (6,600 ft)

Geology
- Type: River valley

Geography
- Location: Thiers, Puy-de-Dôme, Auvergne-Rhône-Alpes, France
- Population centers: Thiers
- Coordinates: 45°51′47″N 03°34′50″E
- Rivers: Durolle
- Interactive map of Vallée des Rouets

The Vallée des Rouets (French pronunciation: [vale de ʁwɛ], “Valley of Mills”) is a part of the valley of the river Durolle, principally situated on the land of Thiers, in the French department of Puy-de-Dôme in the Auvergne-Rhône-Alpes region. The area is known for its long artisanal past, as the inhabitants have made use of the locomotive power of the Durolle River since the Middle Ages. The beginning of the 20th century marked the closure of most of the water-powered mills in the valley in favor of the production of cutlery, mainly situated in the Vallée des Usines (Valley of Factories), located downstream.

After multiple years of mobilizing to protect the architectural heritage of Vallée des Rouets, the town hall of Thiers, under the direction of deputy mayor Maurice Adevah-Pœuf, opened a tourist route to the public in 1998. The route was combined with a museum of cutlery featuring the history of the location and fabrication techniques for knives as well as the operation of the last mill in operation in the valley and its water wheel.

== Toponymy ==
The term “Vallée des Rouets” is used to describe the part of the valley of the Durolle where the number of old water wheels is significant. The name of the valley did not become official until the start of the 20th century.

== Geography ==
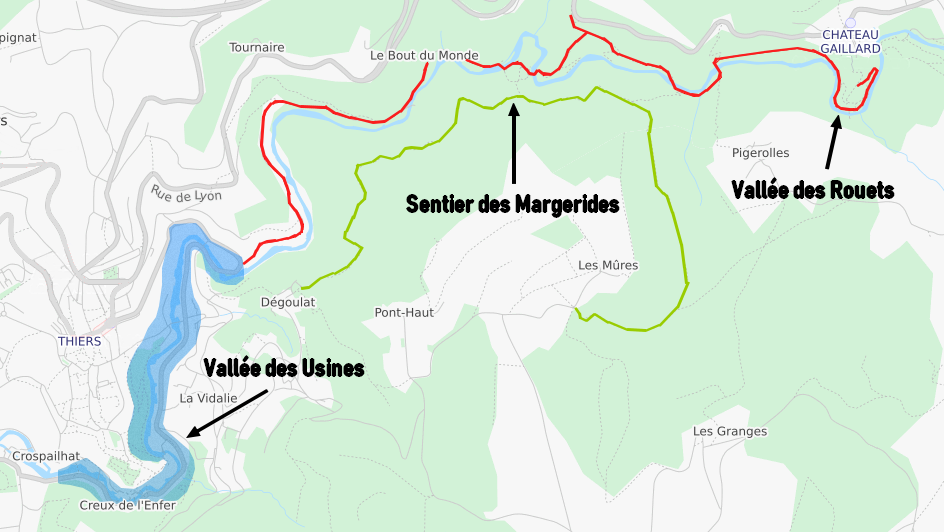
Locations of tourist sites along the Durolle River.

=== Location ===
In the east, the valley forms at the height of the Chez Lyonnet mill, still in operation in 2020, near the Membrun Dam. It widens over a distance of 2 km (1.2 mi) until its easternmost point, formed by the first factories in the location known as "the edge of the world".

La vallée des Rouets is located on the eastern bank of the Durolle in the department of Puy-de-Dôme in the administrative region of Auvergne-Rhône-Alpes).

Panorama of the gorges of the Durolle between the Vallée des Usines and the Vallée des Rouets.

=== Topography ===
The valley was carved over the centuries by the Durolle.

The valley spreads out from the confluence of the Durolle with the Membrun Dam downstream, until it reaches the Vallée des Usines. The eastern portion of the valley is punctuated by several peaks higher than 600 metres (2,000 ft). The western part of the valley, after the last mill, continues its winding path before gently widening to make room for the larger factories constructed on the banks of the Durolle.

Until the 13th century, the Vallée des Rouets was a site for viticulture, which was practiced on the slopes that dominate the area.

=== Geology ===
The geological history of the Thiers region is characterized by the presence and behavior of a major fault oriented from north to south, which affects the region's bedrock. The fault divides the bedrock in distinct sections, which allows the tectonic collapse of the western section while the eastern section remains more or less in place.

The collapse of the western bedrock allows both sides of the fault to fill with sedimentary rocks, forming the Limagne basin upon which the lower town of Thiers is built. In the east, the bedrock that has not collapsed lies under the Forez mountains, which are made up of igneous rocks that support the upper town. The Vallée des Rouets cuts through these rocks.

The soil of the valley is part of the geographic formation Massif Central. It consists mainly of different granites, sometimes mixed with sand and gravel.

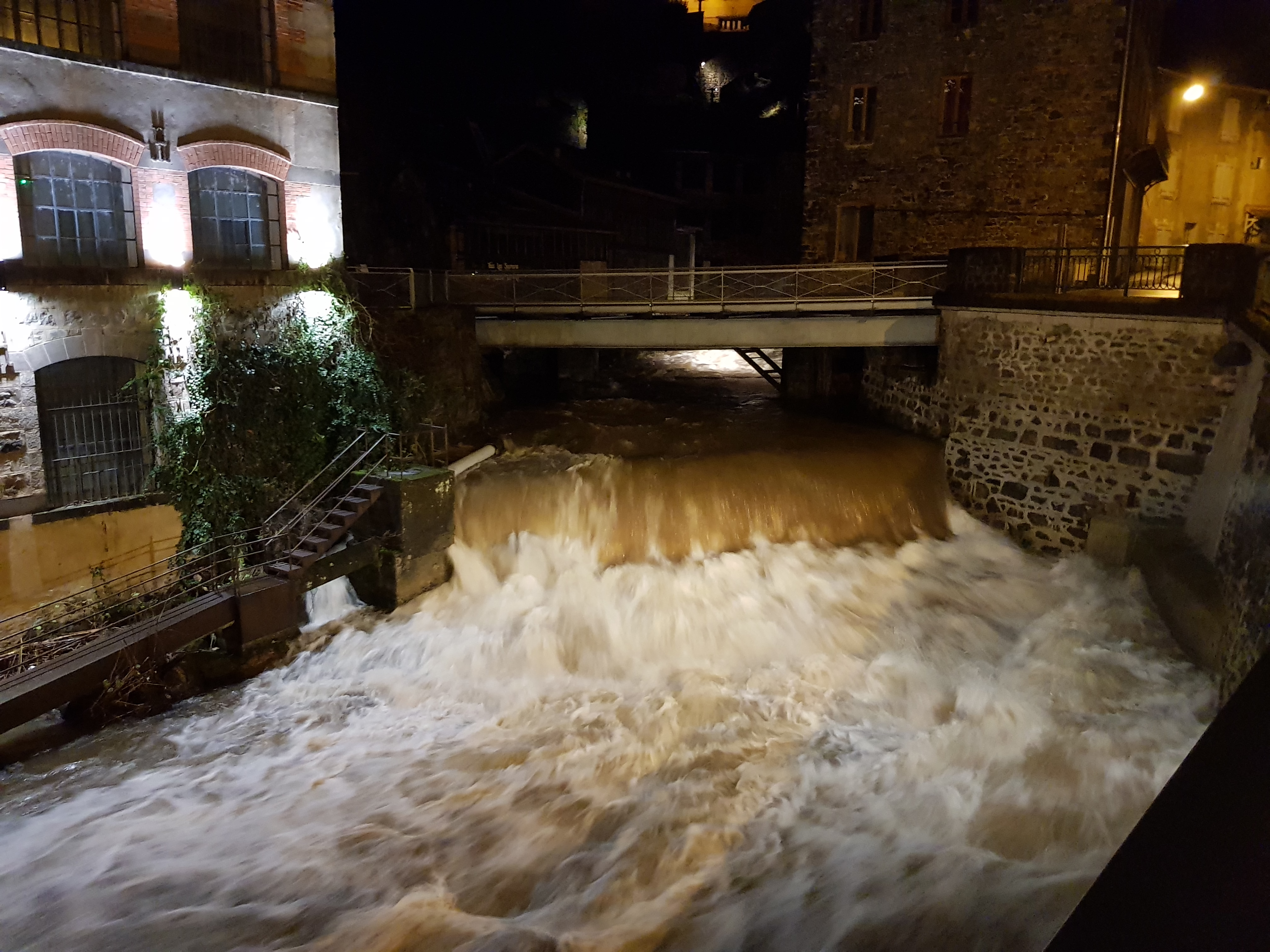
The Durolle in the Vallée des Usines at the Usine de May.

=== Hydrography ===
The valley is drained by the 32 kilometres (20 mi) long river Durolle, the drainage basin of which is 1,456 square kilometres (562 sq mi). The river has been utilized for its locomotive power, particularly to drive the mechanisms to sharpen knife blades. The river is also a trout fishing area, due to the improvement of water quality in the 21st century.

=== Demography ===
The town of Thiers encompasses the majority of the Vallée des Rouets. Further upstream, the Durolle cuts through the towns La Monnerie-le-Montel, Celles-sur-Durolle, Les Salles, Cervières, Noirétable and Chabreloche.

=== Transportation ===
The main road of the region is departmental route 2089 (formerly national route 89), which follows the right bank of the Durolle around the curve of the river from east to west. It is impossible to access the water by car, due to the steep slope of the bank. The entrance of the valley is served by the Thiers Urban Transport (TUT) network. The Thiers train station is located 5 kilometres (3.1 mi) from the tourist information point at the valley's entrance.

== History ==
=== Middle Ages ===
The hydropower capability of the Durolle has been used by Thiers since the Middle Ages to power flour mills, tanneries, papermakers' mallets, and with the development of cutlery, smelter's pans and grinding wheels. A legend tells that crusaders from Auvergne brought back the secret of metalworking from the Orient. Since the 15th century, a quarter of the population of Thiers has work in the cutlery trade. The products of the valley were exported to many countries in the 17th century, including Spain, Italy, Germany, Turkey, and "the Indies".

=== Industrial Revolution ===
Starting in 1850, only cutlery was able to continue production after the introduction of the machines that would herald the beginning of industrialization. The labor necessary to make a knife was spread out across the village; there was a large division of work. Workers specialized in one trade, transmitted from father to son, which they would acquire great precision in. Iron bars would first go to the hammer mills, where large trip hammers, powered by the river, would pound them flat. The smiths received the metal next and forged the blades of the knives. The pieces were then sent to filers, drillers, sharpeners, and finally polishers who sharpened and polished the blades on grindstones powered by the mills. The manufacturer determined the caliber; then, after the horn carver delivered the handles, all the pieces would be returned to the fitters in the faubourgs of Thiers. This method of production is principally characterized by the division of labor across the region of Thiers and especially in the Vallée.

At the end of the 19th century, foreign competition led the industry of Thiers to modernize by switching to electric power. A new type of factory was created that integrated the various steps of the cutlery manufacturing process. Paper mills that did not keep up with modern production methods were forced to close their doors; by 1860, there were no more than 20.

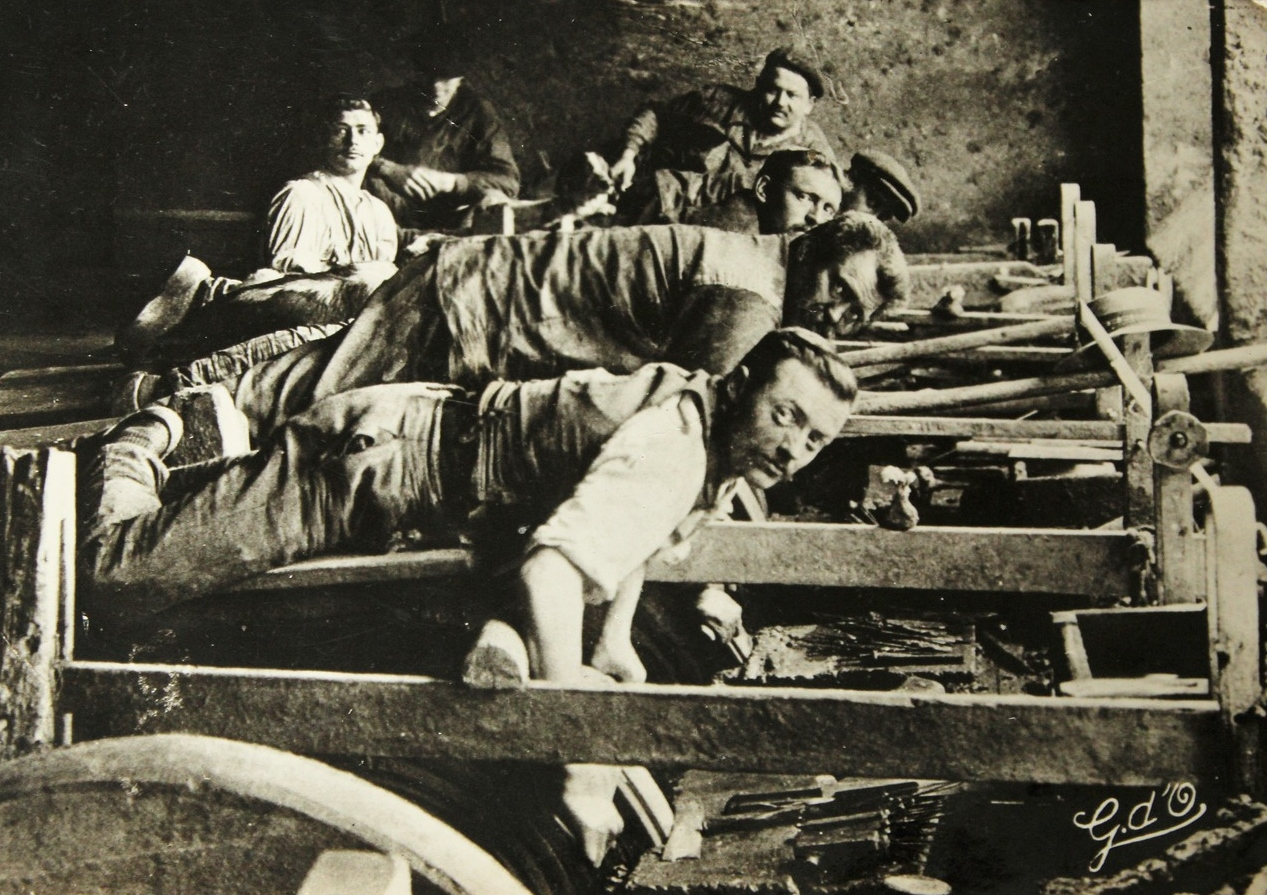
Sharpeners from Thiers in their watermill at the start of the 20th century.

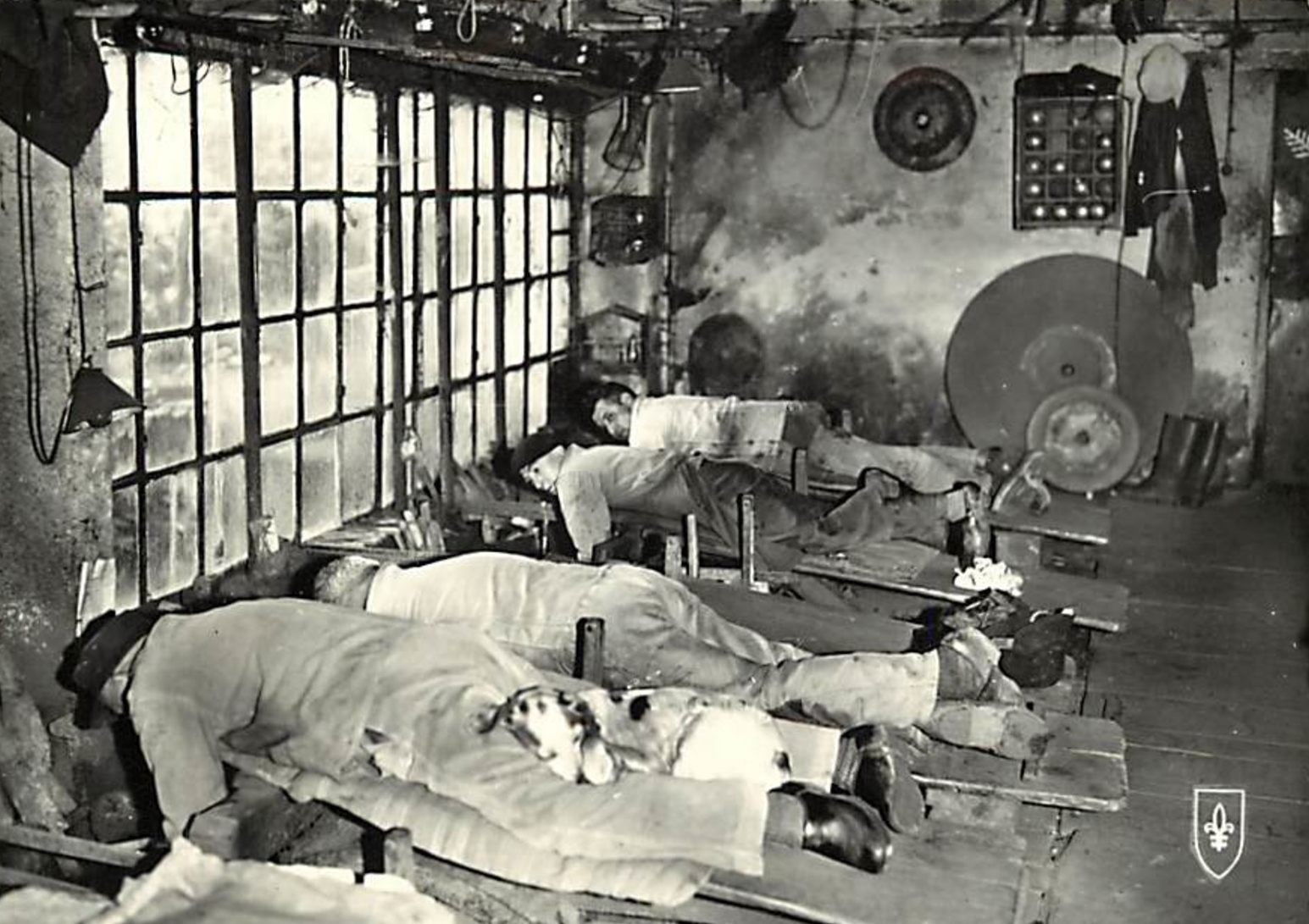
Thiernois sharpeners in their workshop in the early 20th century.

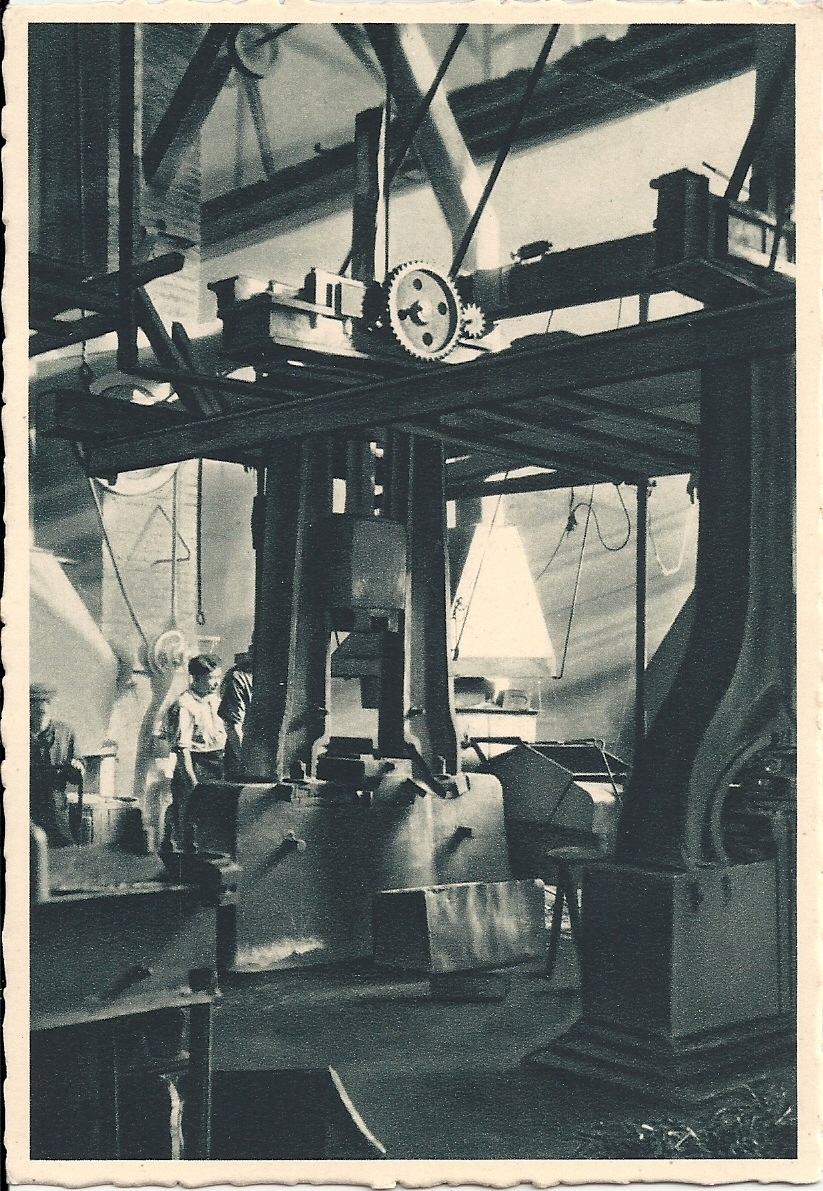
A steam hammer in a workshop belonging to the Société générale de coutellerie et d'orfèvrerie in the early 1930s.

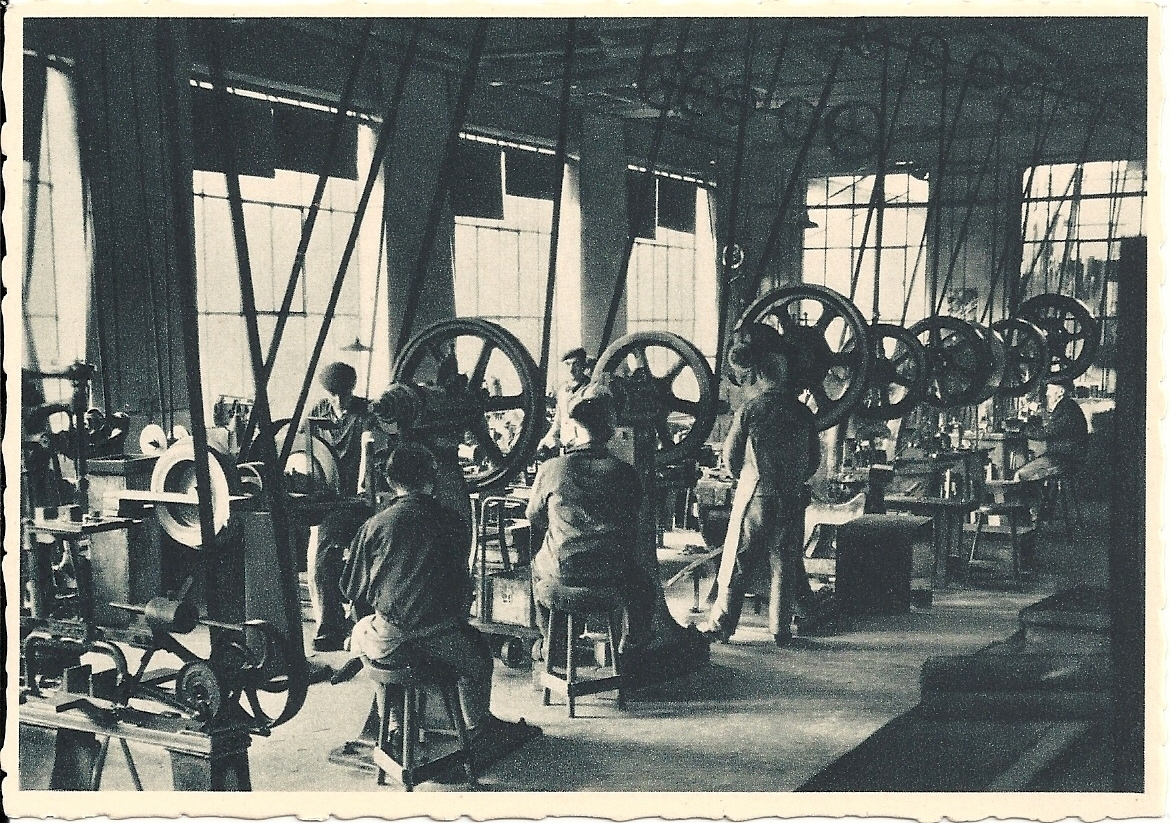
Inside a workshop of the Société générale de coutellerie et d'orfèvrerie in the early 1930s.

=== Beginning of the 20th century ===
Problems in the water of the Durolle became more frequent in the early 20th century. To begin with, the flow of the river in summer is low and very irregular, resulting in a commiserate level of unemployment. In effect, the water-powered mills are unable to operate without enough water flow. In winter, the opposite occurs, and the Durolle becomes a torrential flood with considerable force. The town of Thiers is one of the most vulnerable to floods in Puy-de-Dome, and the Vallée des Rouets is the area of the town most affected.

To avoid depending on the unpredictable Durolle, factories downstream began using electric power in 1903. The Durolle could produce an average power of around 1,000 horsepower (750 kW) in 1920, compared to 1,500 horsepower (1,100 kW) from electric sources.

The average locomotive power from electricity:

year	power in horsepower
1903	170 ▲
1908	803 ▲
1914	1,123 ▲
1920	1,500 ▲

The factories' independence from the Durolle allowed them to become "complete factories". As a result, more than 12,000 workers and 550 manufacturers were present in the Durolle valley in 1912. During this period, the Thiers region was the largest production area in France for knives and other bladed tools, far ahead of Châtellerault, Nogent-en-Bassigny, and Paris, and on par with Sheffield in the United Kingdom.

Production from 1912, showing many fluctuations:

year	production in tonnes
1912	3,108 tonnes (3,059 long tons; 3,426 short tons)▲
1918	1,210 tonnes (1,190 long tons; 1,330 short tons)▼
1920	2,618 tonnes (2,577 long tons; 2,886 short tons)▲

=== Gradual closures in the 1930s ===
Beginning in the 1930s, the mills and the artisanal production of knives that depended on the Durolle were not able to compete with the factories, which produced their knives at a lower cost. The mills gradually closed until the 1970s, when the last operating mill closed its doors in 1976. This mill, Chez Lyonnet, was continuously maintained by the owner until his death, when the town of Thiers and the "Pays Thiernois" association picked up the torch in 1980s.

The mills remained in a state of abandonment after their closure and deteriorated rapidly in the dark and humid environment at the bottom of the gorges of the Durolle where they were built. Only the sturdiest parts remain: the walls, the mill races, and even the water wheels. The gardens located behind the workshops, which supported the workers, disappeared very rapidly.

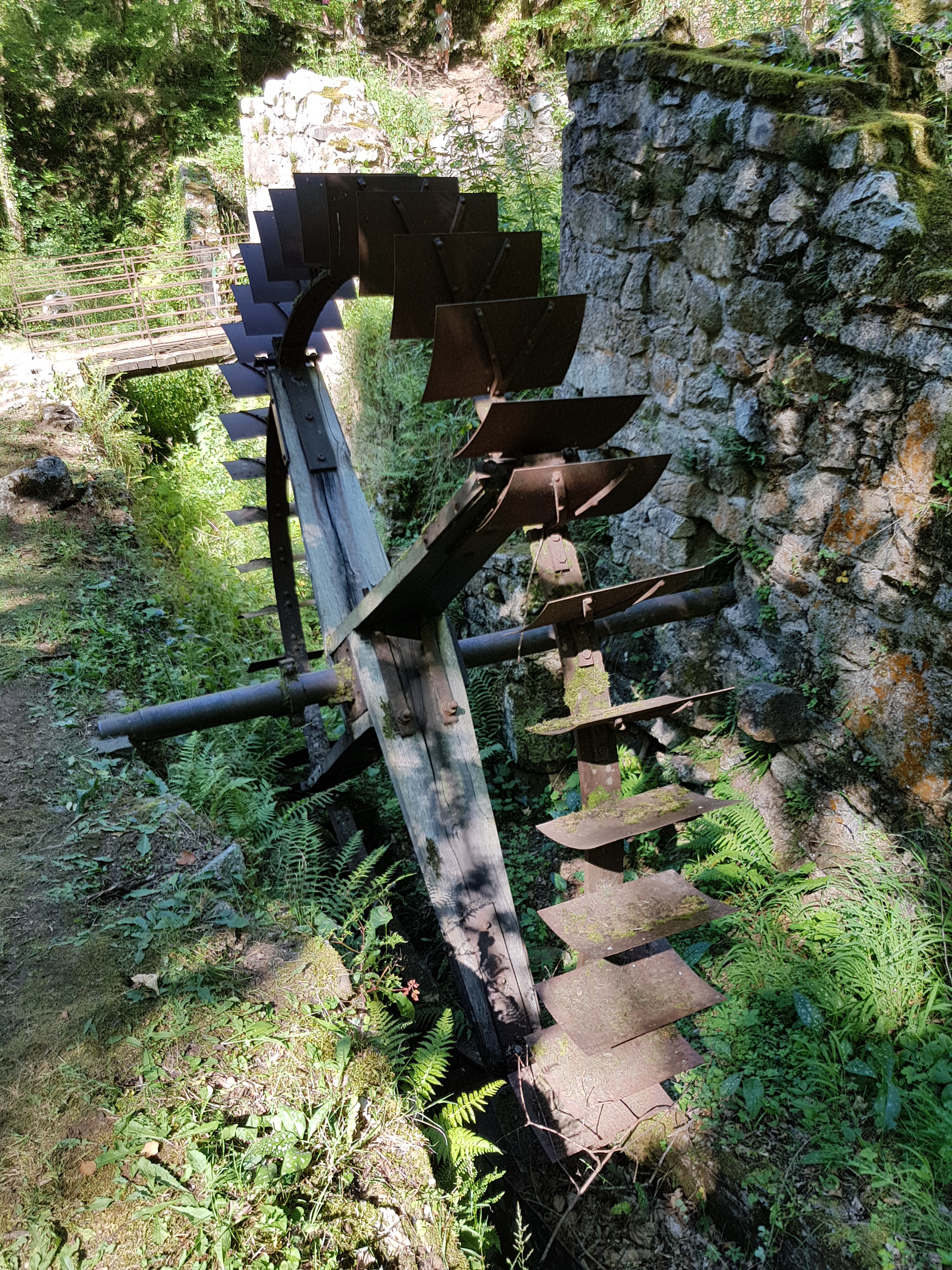
An abandoned water wheel near a hiking path.

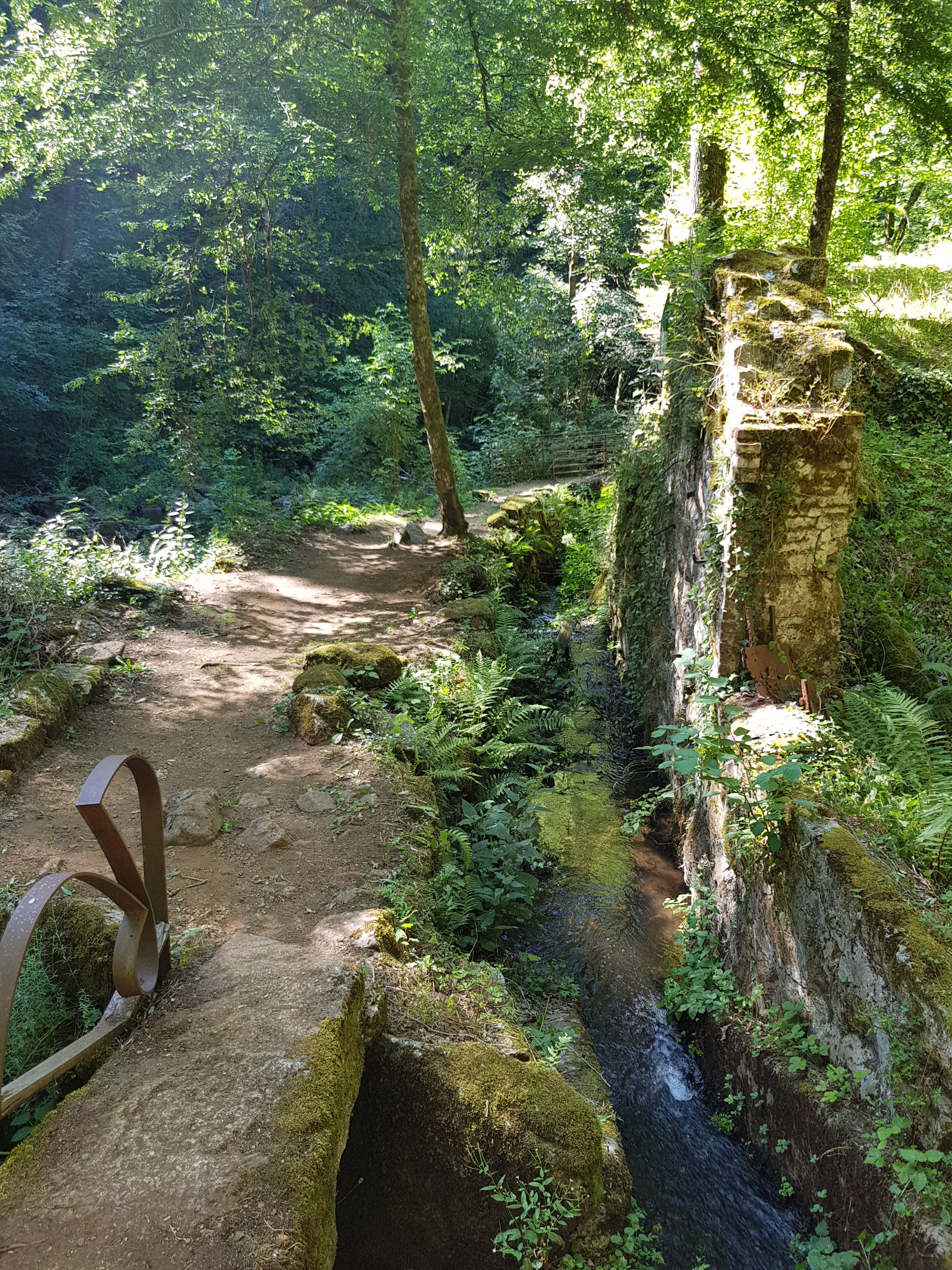
The hiking path following the course of the Durolle.

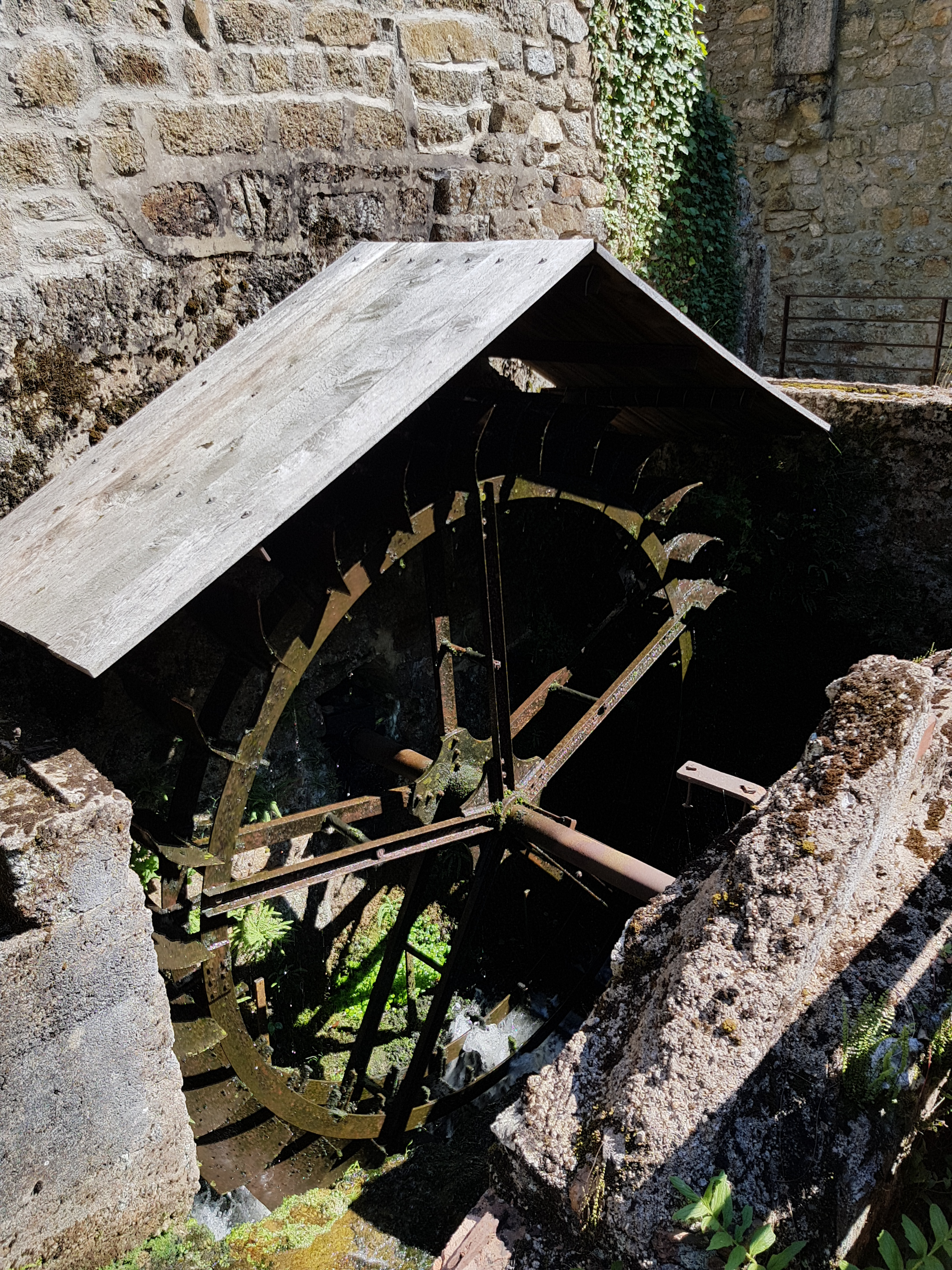
The water wheel of Chez Lyonnet.

=== Development in the 1980s ===
In the early 1980s, the Pays thiernois association assembled to protect architectural heritage of the Vallée des Rouets. Its members, passionate about the region's history, began by clearing the path to access all the mills. The last mill in the valley to close in 1976 has been preserved since then.

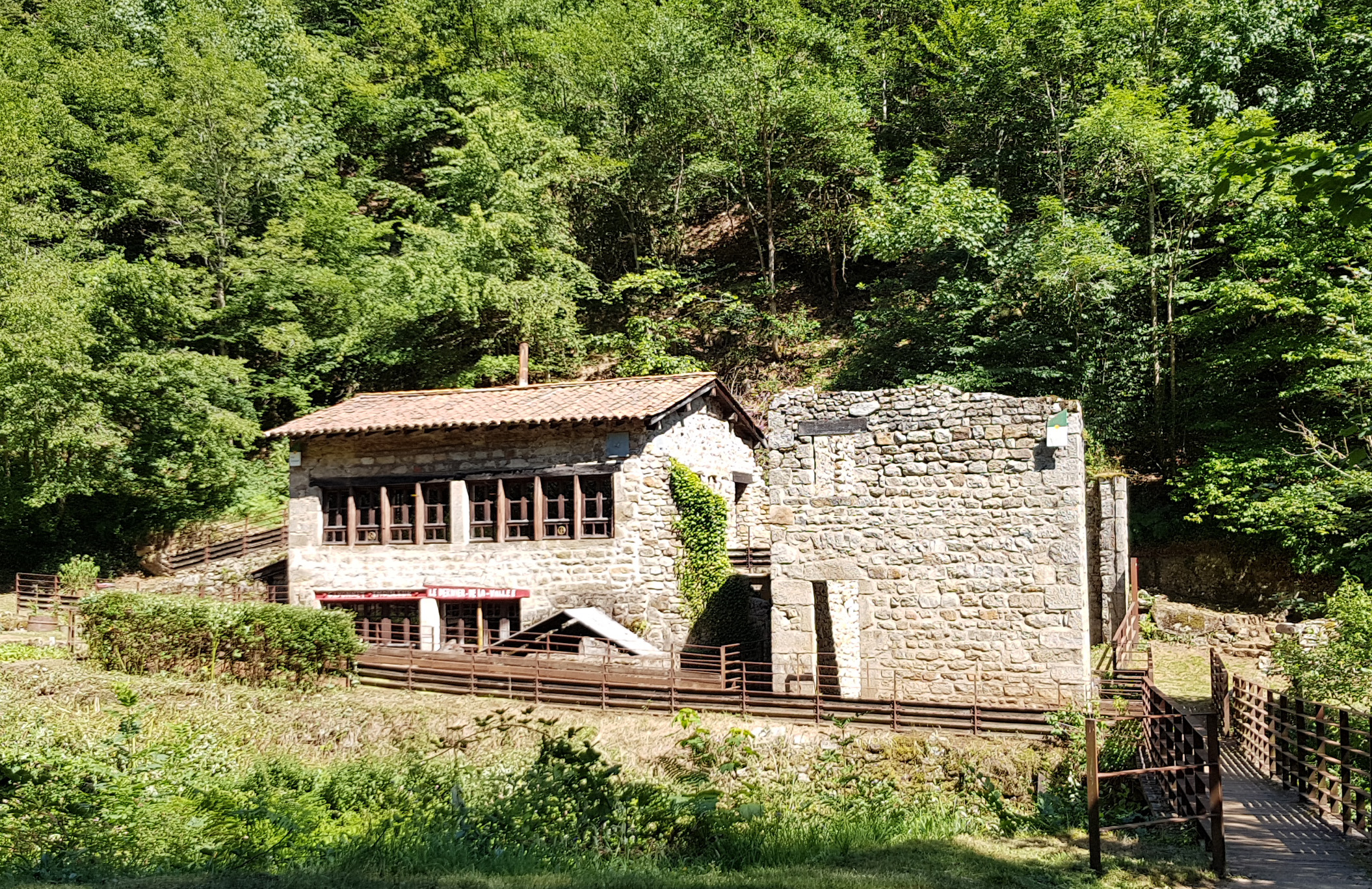
Chez Lyonnet mill, open to visitors.

In 1982, the first portion of the cutlery museum opened its doors on Place Lafayette in the medieval city of Thiers. The first year of visits was promising, with the museum seeing 17,000 paying visitors. The structure of the museum was special in that the production association La Maison des Couteliers added the exhibits. This enabled visitors to see not just knife collections, but an artisanal company that demonstrates that knife production is still current in Thiers. In 1992, the second part of the museum opened to the public in the l'Homme des bois house on Rue de la Coutellerie. This guides visitors through the history and origins of Thiernois cutlery. However, neither of the museum's locations are near the Durolle, so a third part was conceived. In 1994, the town returned to the Chez Lyonnet mill project with the aim of creating a museum. On 19 September 1998, the third part of the museum was officially inaugurated, and the Vallée des Rouets opened to the public.

=== Thiernois cutlery in the 21st century ===
Even if there were no more couteliers working in the valley and fewer than 10 in the Vallée des Usines in January 2015, Thiers remains the largest center of cutlery in France since the 19th century. In fact, while the companies left the Durolle in the second half of the 20th century, they moved to the industrial areas in the rest of the town. For this reason, in 2015, the Puy-de-Dôme Chamber of Commerce and Industry (CCI) counted 78 cutlery manufacturers employing 852 people directly and close to 2,000 people indirectly. Including the 34 artisan couteliers, 94% of cutlery businesses and 99% of cutlery jobs in Auvergne are located in Thiers.

While Thiers still produced 80% of French knife purchases in 2018, the industry moved little by little towards a more artisanal production style. For example, the knife festival Coutellia, which celebrates the art and tradition of knives, shows that this type of production is growing. Thiers is also a member of Ville et métiers d’art network, which promotes the installment of professional artisans in the town.

== Protection ==
The Vallée des Rouets is located near the December 1980 conservation and development plan (Plan de sauvegarde et de mise en valeur, PSMV) of Thiers

None of the objects or buildings are included on the list of monuments historiques, but many buildings in direct proximity to the Vallée des Rouets are counted in the Inventaire général du patrimoine culturel (General inventory of cultural heritage), a list of cultural sites in France:

Mill	Factory	Machine (in Chez Lyonnet)
Douris Mill; Lyonnet Mill; Beaujeu-Guérin Mill	Chabanne; Marty-Prot; Coste steel factory; Guérin-Prugne	water wheel; grinding machine; transmission systems; polishing machine; continuous electricity generator

== Tourism ==
The Vallée des Rouets is one of the most popular tourist sites in Thiers. The valley also has one star on the Michelin guide with the note "interesting".

As the third part of the Cutlery Museum, the Vallée des Rouets and its museum route complete a scene for visitors. In the first part of the museum, located at 23 Rue de la Coutellerie in Maison de l'Homme des Bois, the history of Thiernois cutlery is mainly presented with the help of artworks. A the second part of the museum, located at 58 Rue de la Coutellerie, couteliers explain and demonstrate how knives are manufactured in the Thiernois tradition in a room designed after 19th century forges. At each stage, collections of knife art are displayed, before the route ends at the museum shop, where knives and related products made by the museum's couteliers are displayed for sale.

Hiking trails are plotted throughout the valley. The trails allow hikers to see the countryside of the valley and its volcanic peaks. Trout fishing is also available in the area. Visitors are educated on local flora and fauna when they arrive at the tourist information point at the site's entrance.

== Administration and visits ==
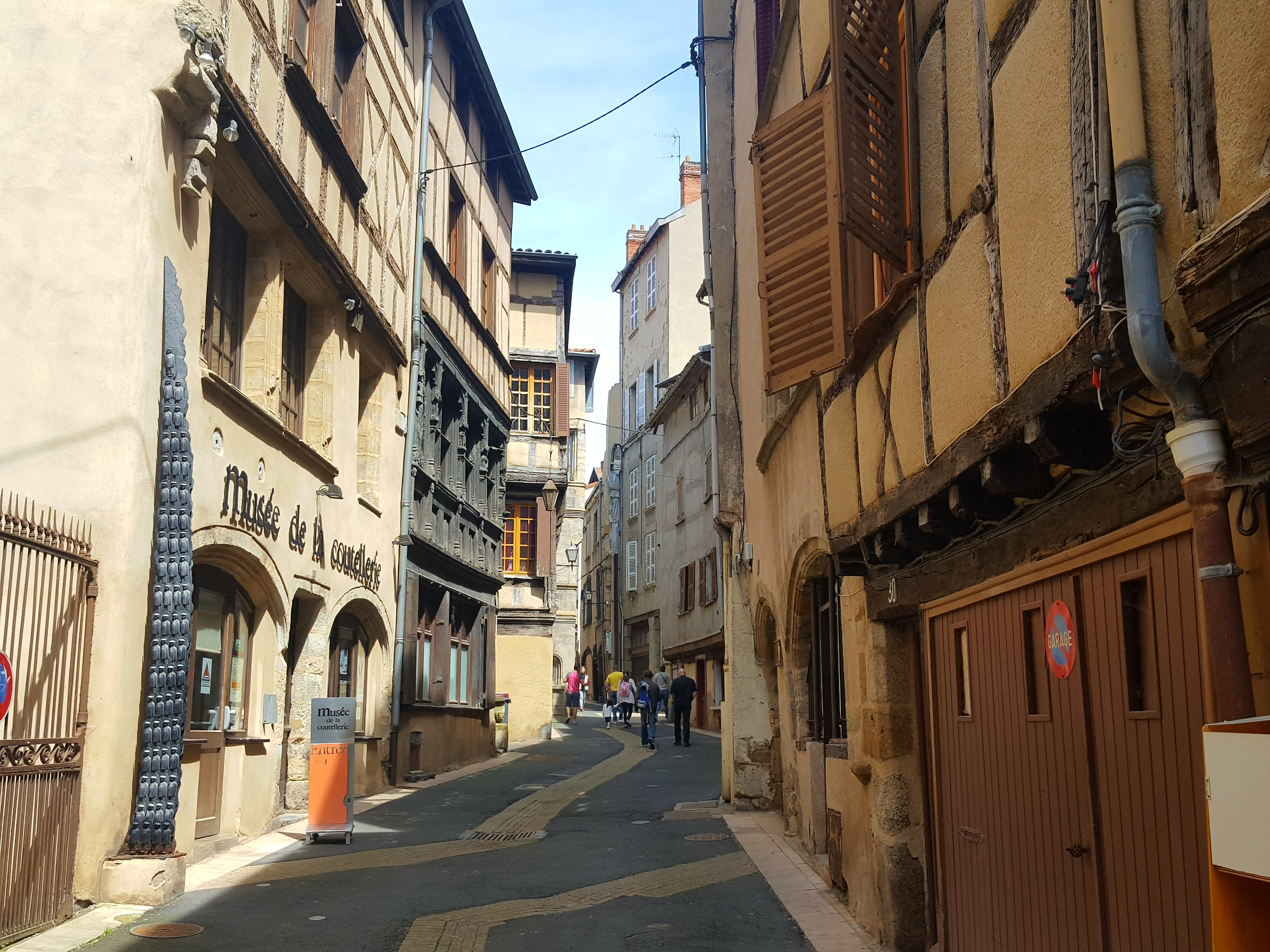
The first part of the Cutlery Museum in the l'Homme des Bois house on Rue de la Coutellerie.

Because of the consolidation of the Vallée des Rouets with the Cutlery Museum, the two entities share an administration.

Visits to the mill are organized between 1 June and 30 September. Outside of the summer season, only the hiking paths are open to the public.

In 1998, the date the Vallée des Rouets was opened, the Cutlery Museum counted 50,000 paying entries. In 2015, there were nearly 23,000 visitors. The number of visitors has hovered around 25,000 since 2017, leaving the Cutlery Museum the fourth most visited museum in the former region of Auvergne (now part of Auvergne-Rhône-Alpes). In 2016, the Vallée des Rouets over 5,000 monthly visitors between June and September.
