= Thiers ramparts =

Fortifications in Thiers

- Thiers, Puy-de-Dôme, Auvergne-Rhône-Alpes, France
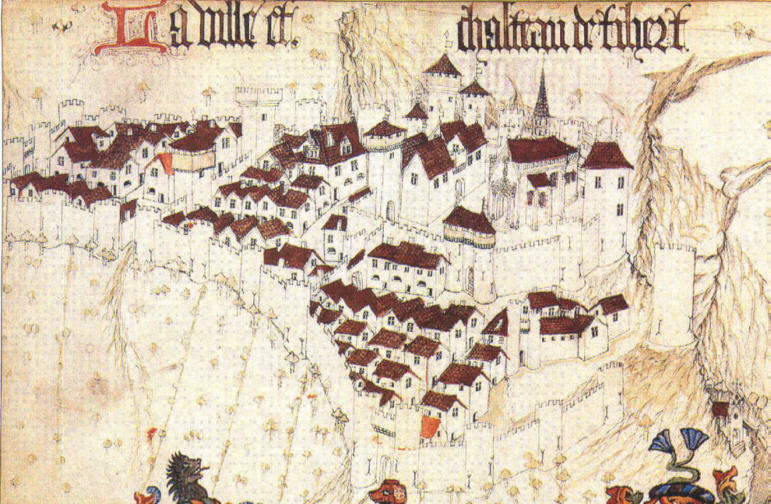
- The town of Thiers with its castle and ramparts circa 1450

Site information
- Owner: Private property, city of Thiers

Location
- Coordinates: 45°51′15″N 3°32′57″E

Site history
- Built: 17th century
- In use: Medieval, Baroque and Neoclassical architecture

Garrison information
- Designations: Thier outstanding heritage site; part included on the list of MH

The Thiers ramparts are fortifications erected between the 11th and 16th centuries to protect the town of Thiers in the Puy-de-Dôme department, France.

Since the 11th century, the town has undergone a process of concentric expansion around the ramparts of the lord's castle and the Saint-Genès church. As new villages were established near the city walls, the fortified town underwent at least five periods of expansion. The least well-maintained sections of the walls were demolished in the late 18th century, with the majority of urban redevelopment in the 19th century resulting in the destruction of several segments of the northern wall and the repurposing of the eastern wall. By the nineteenth century, only the eastern section of the fortifications remained intact, primarily serving as a retaining wall for the sloping terrain of the town.

The entire structure of the town's ramparts has been designated a notable heritage site and is overseen by the local urban planning and heritage conservation plan (PSMV).

== History ==
=== First Enclosure ===
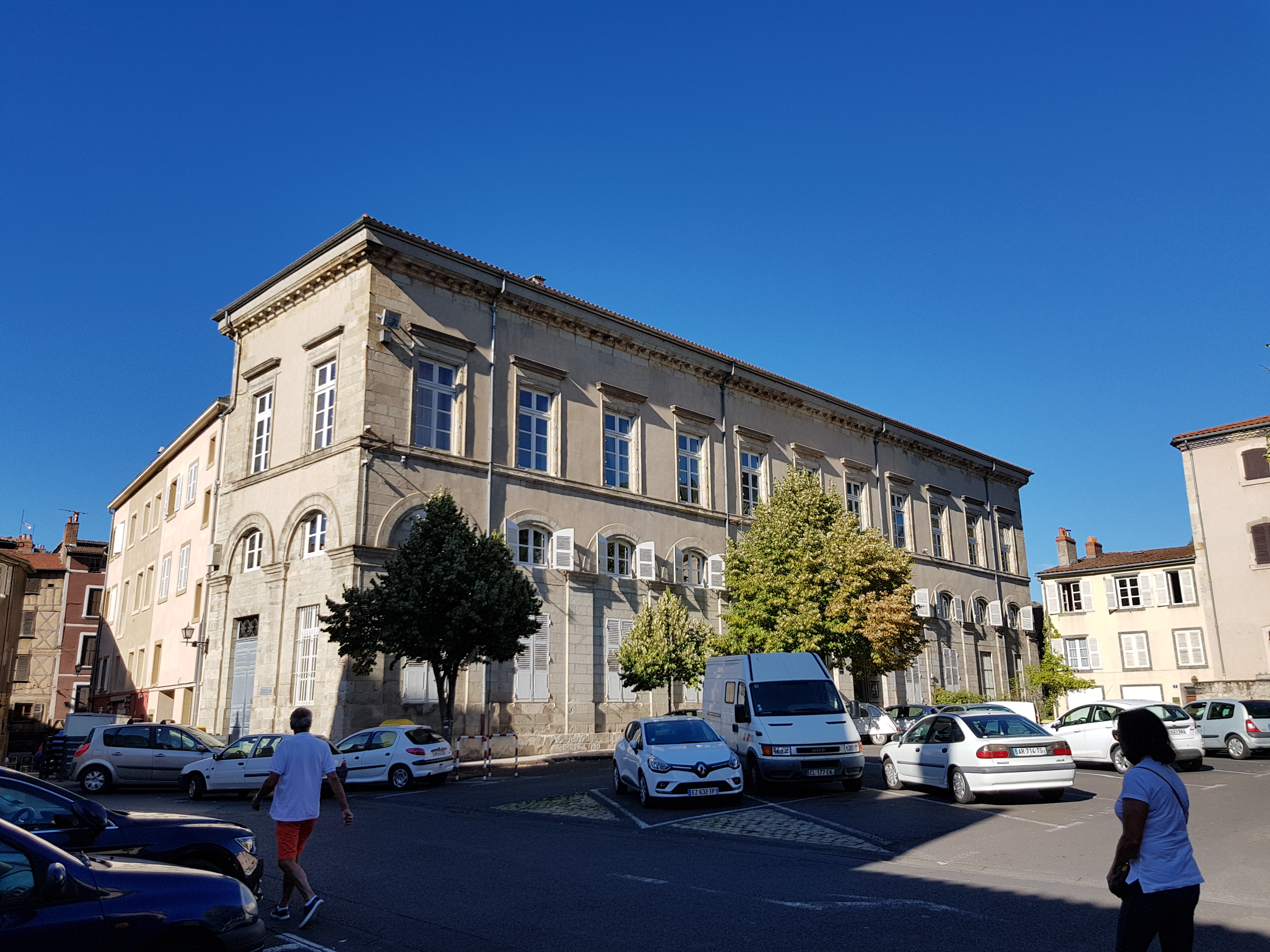
The site of the Chastel Palace is now partially covered by the Thiers District Court.

In the 11th century, the initial fortification was constructed, encompassing both the feudal castle and the Saint-Genès church. Two Romanesque gates were built in this initial wall, allowing passage to the path that led to the town. During the 15th century, it was designated as the "wall of the Palace of Chastel." The primary thoroughfare of this inaugural district of the city is named in commemoration of this structure; it is currently known as the "Rue du Palais," although it should be referred to as the "Rue du Palais du Chastel."

The configuration of the streets and squares within the wall does not appear to have been planned according to a strict and pre-established scheme. The initial path remained in the same location; even the construction of the first wall did not result in a significant alteration to the general direction of the path, which entered the enclosure through the "Porte de la Bout" (demolished at the end of the 19th century) at the top of the current rue du Palais and exited by the "Square Tower of the Chancellery" in front of the current rue du Bourg. The gate, now backfilled and walled up, can still be seen above the Place du Pirou. The space between the Chastel Palace and the church has always remained open. From the outset, this space was used as a public gathering place in times of peace, but it also served as a refuge for local farmers bringing their herds to safety in times of insecurity. In the 15th century, it was transformed into a cemetery.

=== Second enclosure ===
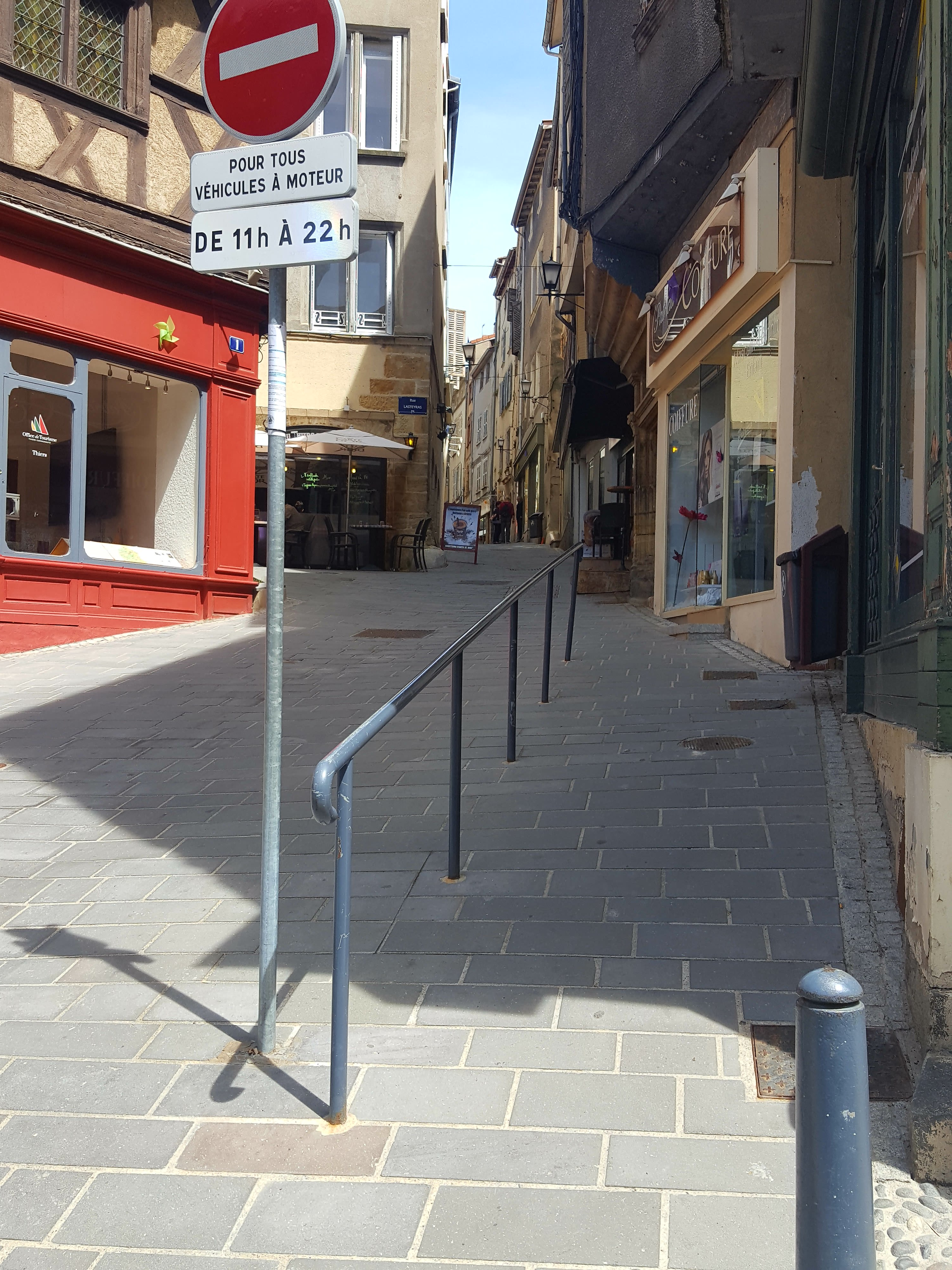
Rue du Bourg in 2017.

At the beginning of the 13th century, the town experienced a period of expansion to the north, resulting in the construction of a new wall surrounding the existing houses. This new neighborhood was served by a significant freshwater spring, later channeled into the Pirou fountain, located close to the initial wall. The primary thoroughfare of this urban expansion is Rue du Bourg. Two further principal thoroughfares were subsequently constructed: the Rue du Pourcharesse (subsequently renamed Rue Lasteyras) and the Rue du Transvaal (subsequently renamed Rue du Bourg). During this period, the appellations assigned to streets in the city frequently derived from geographical sources, either denoting the location of the street or the neighborhood it served. In Thiers, it is uncommon for a street to retain the same designation since the fifteenth century.

=== Third enclosure ===
In the fourteenth century, a new neighborhood was forming in the relatively protected angle to the east by the "wall of the Palace of Chastel" and to the north by the "wall of the Palace of Bourg." To protect this expansion, a new wall was constructed, known as the "new wall of the city of Thiart," which constitutes the city's third wall.

Upon the erection of a new wall, new houses were constructed on either side of the now disused old wall. Initially, a "relay" was left along the old wall. The configuration of the houses resulted in the formation of a new street on either side, situated parallel to the original wall. Furthermore, the wall could serve as the foundation for the facades of houses. At this juncture, the new street followed the remains of the old wall, as evidenced by the second and third walls. The layout of the streets in Thiers remained profoundly shaped by the fortifications, which held unparalleled importance in the city's urban planning. These defensive structures were constructed under the existing space to be protected, optimizing the use of the terrain. Religious considerations and military necessities directed the city's development, and although this is now largely overlooked, it is still discernible in the city's topography, which can be characterized as picturesque.

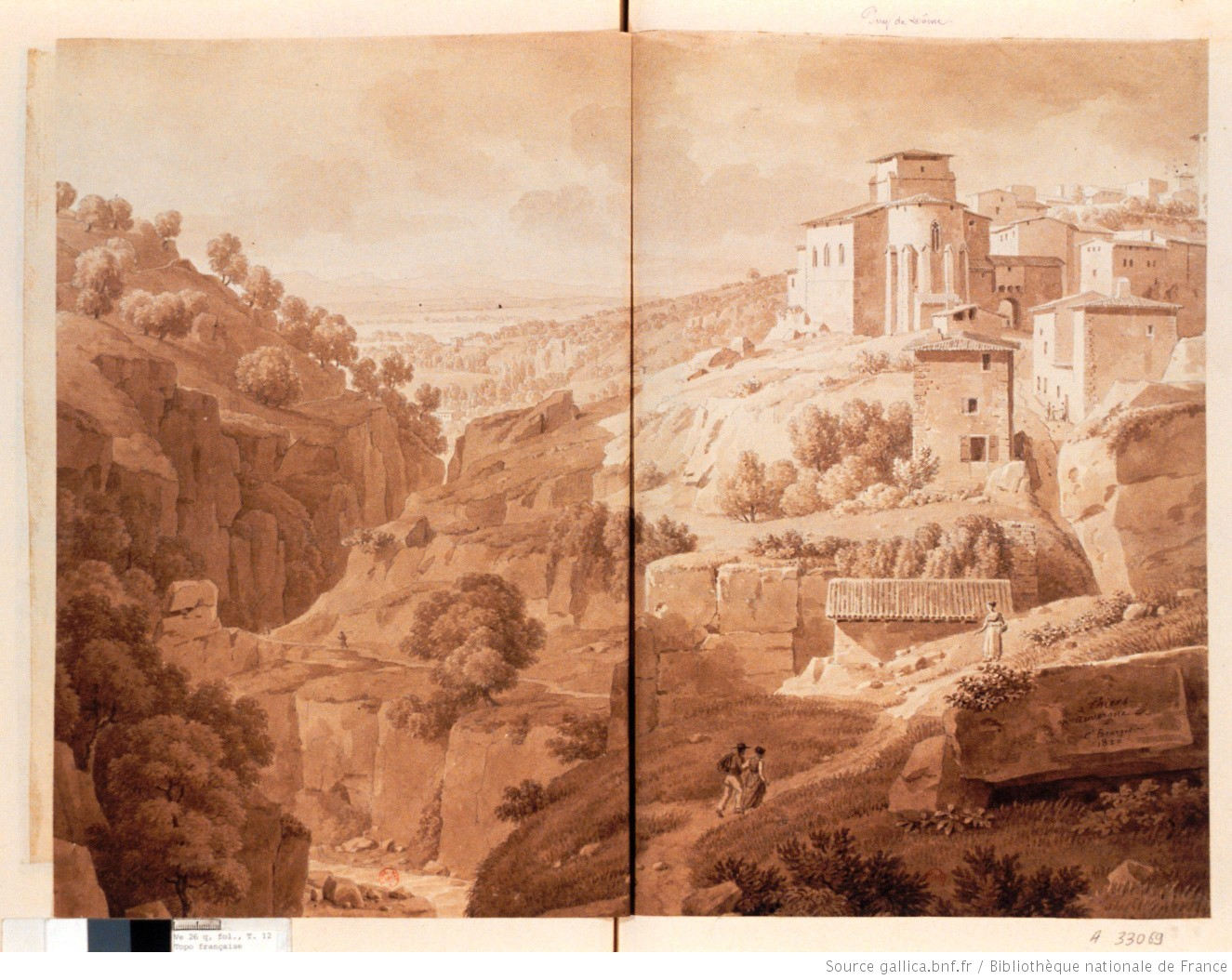
The Vallée des Usines and the Saint-Jean district in the 18th century. The Church of St John and the gate of the same name can be seen in the top right-hand corner of the image.

=== Fourth enclosure ===
In the fifteenth century, the city's expansion was such that a fourth wall was constructed, encompassing the previous three. This final wall, covering a significantly larger area than the preceding ones, was promptly designated the "city wall." The wall's construction was initiated by Louis II of Bourbon around 1400. At that time, the city was experiencing the final in a series of devastating wars, later known as the Hundred Years' War.

=== Fifth enclosure ===
In the sixteenth century, the lordship initiated the construction of a final defensive wall to safeguard the recently developed residential areas on the eastern mountainside, close to the Durolle River and the Vallée des Usines. Despite its relatively modest dimensions, this wall represented the closest defensive structure to the aforementioned locations.

=== Other defensive elements ===
The city's walls and gates were reinforced with protective elements from their construction. These included embrasures, called bouches à feu in the region, which allowed archers or gunners to fire. As Michel Combronde notes in Représentation graphique de la porte Neufve au début du XV^{e} siècle, many loopholes were also in the city's towers and walls.

The work of historian André Kristos draws attention to several examples of what are known as brayettes. It would appear that these are false braies, a term that was used in the 15th century to describe such structures. They constitute an embankment or retaining wall that encircles a fortified camp. In the context of premodern fortification, this ante-chamber was situated between the moat and the primary defensive wall of a fortress. The brayette was positioned lower than the main wall to defend it from the moat. Two brayettes were discovered in Thiers. The first, called the "brayette du Chastel," surrounded and protected the Chapter Tower of the first wall, and the second, the "brayette du Bourg," situated further north, protected the Montauld Tower of the second wall.

=== Final reinforcements and partial dismantling ===
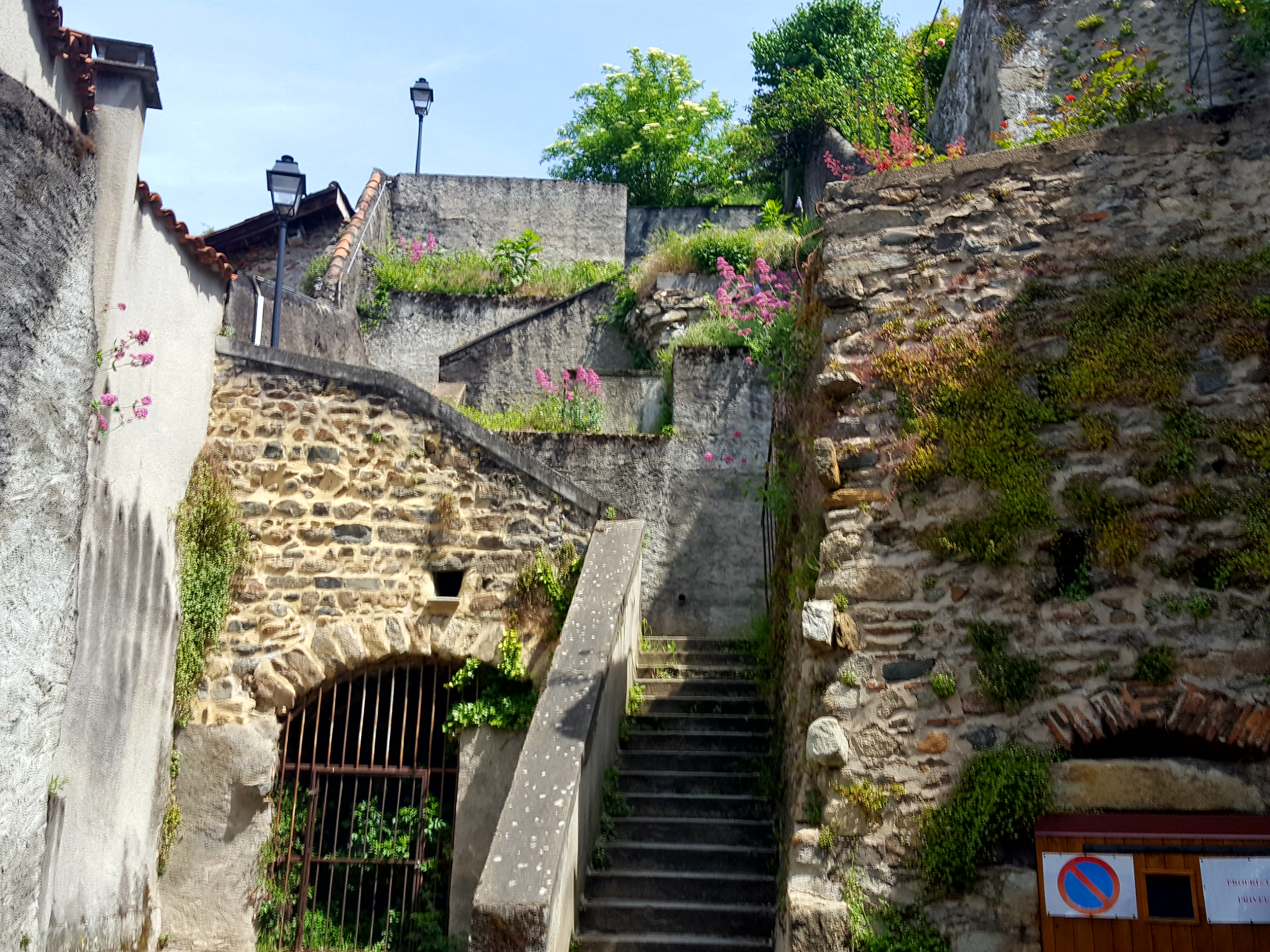
Rue Chauchat with part of the fourth wall on the left.

The Wars of Religion commenced in 1562 in France. The inhabitants of Thiers were particularly susceptible to the influence of the "new ideas" due to their openness to external influences, particularly those emanating from the Lyon basin. As early as 1551, Antoine Chabrol, a cutler from Thiers, elected to flee to Switzerland. He was among the initial cohort of Protestant migrants seeking asylum in the country between 1549 and 1556. In the subsequent years, numerous individuals from Thiers migrated to Geneva. The city promptly augmented its fortifications to deter an incursion by the Huguenots, who increasingly threatened the city. Nevertheless, in 1568, they managed to gain entry and wreaked havoc on a portion of it.

From the 17th century onwards, Thiers experienced urban expansion as a consequence of significant economic growth driven by the flourishing cutlery industry in the region. As the population increased, the city undertook various improvements to facilitate movement within the city walls, such as constructing the Saint-Genès pedestrian route (see below). At the end of the 18th century, the city planned the destruction of part of the walls to prevent the collapse of poorly maintained sections and to widen traffic routes. Other parts of the walls were also destroyed to create streets in their place, such as Rue Grenette and Rue Pasteur.

In the nineteenth century, the northern section of the fourth wall was almost entirely demolished to facilitate the construction of new thoroughfares, including the roads, rue Victor-Hugo, and rue Prosper-Marilhat. Consequently, establishing Imperial Road No. 89 – subsequently designated as National Road 89 in 1824 – necessitated the destruction of five defensive towers and two gates.

Despite the partial destruction of Thiers' walls, the majority of these fortifications and their associated towers remain intact to this day. The towers are currently used for residential purposes, as evidenced by the Pignat Tower. The walls, meanwhile, serve two distinct functions. Primarily, they support the underlying land on which the city is constructed. Secondly, they offer a foundation for buildings erected directly on the wall.

=== Protection and enhancement of heritage ===
In 1820, a section of the fourth wall was rebuilt, predominantly comprising the structures that supported the city's eastern land holdings.

The urban wall of Thiers is notable for its high degree of preservation, with nearly two-thirds of its original structure remaining intact. Despite the destruction of several segments during the 19th century, the wall remains one of the most well-preserved examples in the Auvergne region. From the Vallée des Usines to the east and the Limagne plain to the west, the city of Thiers is visible as it is built on a rocky spur surrounded by a belt of walls. This is particularly evident on rue Anna-Chabrol and rue des Murailles, which retain the entirety of the walls that support them.

The entire city's walls are classified as a remarkable heritage site and managed by the urban planning and heritage conservation plan (PSMV). This program contributes to protecting and enhancing the city's historical heritage, of which the walls are a part. However, only a segment of the walls is classified as a historic monument, given that part of the urban fabric rests on the walls.

The Thiers tourist office regularly organizes tours of the medieval city. This tour, entitled "Thiers, the Medieval", provides an insight into the diversity and richness of the upper city's heritage. The tour route encompasses streets where the walls are well preserved, affording the tourist guide the opportunity to provide a concise historical overview of the city's walls and their evolution.

List of elements listed or classified as historical monuments
Protected elements	State	Protection	Date
Church of St John, Thiers	Closed to the public	Listing	October 27, 1986
12 Rue de la Coutellerie	Collapsed in 2012	Listing	July 13, 1926
14 Rue de la Coutellerie	Collapsed in 2012	Classification	August 9, 1922
Cutlery Museum	Houses part 2 of the Cutlery Museum	Listing	March 21, 1983
Lauzun House	In good condition	Listing	July 13, 1926

Main stages of construction or destruction of the Thiers ramparts

== Detailed map ==
Detailed map of the ramparts and inner city of Thier		The dotted portions of the curtain wall and the elements (gates and towers) with white letters are destroyed.
Remaining elements	Disappeared elements	The dotted portions of the curtain wall and the elements (gates and towers) with white letters are destroyed.
1: Chastel Palace	A: Chapter Tower	The dotted portions of the curtain wall and the elements (gates and towers) with white letters are destroyed.
2: Square Tower of the Chancellery	B: Bout Gate	The dotted portions of the curtain wall and the elements (gates and towers) with white letters are destroyed.
3: Clock Tower	A: Bourg Portal	The dotted portions of the curtain wall and the elements (gates and towers) with white letters are destroyed.
4: Yrison Tower	B: City Tower	The dotted portions of the curtain wall and the elements (gates and towers) with white letters are destroyed.
5: Chastelain Tower	C: Tower Under the Market Hall	The dotted portions of the curtain wall and the elements (gates and towers) with white letters are destroyed.
6: (Unnamed) Tower	D: Salement Gate	The dotted portions of the curtain wall and the elements (gates and towers) with white letters are destroyed.
7: Pedde Saint-Genès	A: Limagne or Lymagne Gate	The dotted portions of the curtain wall and the elements (gates and towers) with white letters are destroyed.
1: Pedde du Coin des Hasards	B: Tower 2	The dotted portions of the curtain wall and the elements (gates and towers) with white letters are destroyed.
2: Maistre Raymond Tower	C: Tower 1	The dotted portions of the curtain wall and the elements (gates and towers) with white letters are destroyed.
3: Guet Tower	A: Allepit II Tower	The dotted portions of the curtain wall and the elements (gates and towers) with white letters are destroyed.
4: Pignat Tower	B: Neufve Gate	The dotted portions of the curtain wall and the elements (gates and towers) with white letters are destroyed.
5: Montauld Tower	C: Poule Tower	The dotted portions of the curtain wall and the elements (gates and towers) with white letters are destroyed.
1: Tower 3	D: City Tower	The dotted portions of the curtain wall and the elements (gates and towers) with white letters are destroyed.
1: Porte Malorie	E: Lac Portal	The dotted portions of the curtain wall and the elements (gates and towers) with white letters are destroyed.
2: Malorie Tower	F: Town Hall Tower	The dotted portions of the curtain wall and the elements (gates and towers) with white letters are destroyed.
3: Coagne Gate	G: Lyon Gate	The dotted portions of the curtain wall and the elements (gates and towers) with white letters are destroyed.
4: Coagne Tower	H: Tower under the hospital
5: Saint-Jean Gate
6: Allepit I Tower
1: Saint-Jean Church
2: Seychal Gate

== Remaining elements ==
The following elements are described in a clockwise direction, commencing with the Square Tower of the Chancellery, situated to the north of the initial enclosure. Not all of the walls belong to the city of Thiers and are therefore inaccessible during guided tours or at the discretion of the public. Furthermore, the walls are not fully visible from traffic routes. It is also notable that many elements are integrated into the urban landscape.

=== First enclosure ===
A significant proportion of the original structure has been lost or obscured, with only a limited area remaining accessible today. The following table provides an overview of the current status of the surviving elements, along with their accessibility in 2018.

Synthesis of the first enclosure
Element	Owner	Accessibility	Coordinates
Square Tower of the Chancellery	Private property	Integrated into the urban space Partially visible from Rue du Pirou (entrance blocked 3 meters above the street)	45°51′15″N 3°32′52″E
Eastern curtain wall of the Square Tower of the Chancellery	Private property, public road	Integrated into the urban space Partially destroyed to allow passage on Rue du Palais	
Clock Tower	Private property City of Thiers	Integrated into the urban space North and west sides visible via Rue du Pirou South side visible from Place du Palais	45°51′15″N 3°32′53″E
Eastern curtain wall of the Clock Tower	Private property City of Thiers	Visible from the courtyard behind the Tribunal	
Yrison Tower	Private property City of Thiers	Partially destroyed, only a wall section remains, visible from an interior courtyard	45°51′15″N 3°32′54″E
Southeastern curtain wall of the Yrison Tower	Private property City of Thiers	Now serves as a retaining wall, visible behind Saint-Genès Church	
Chastelain Tower	Private property	Partially visible from No. 13, Rue du Palais	45°51′15″N 3°32′52″E
Western curtain wall of the Chapter Tower	Private property, public road	Partially visible from Place Lafayette	
Western curtain wall of the Chastelain Tower	Private property	Hidden behind buildings on Rue de la Coutellerie	
(Unnamed) Tower	Private property	Wall section visible from No. 42, Rue de la Coutellerie	45°51′10″N 3°32′52″E
Southern curtain wall of the Bout Tower	Private property	Partially visible from Rue de la Coutellerie	
Pedde Saint-Genès	Private property, public road	Very well preserved, staircase passage underneath accessible to pedestrians	45°51′13″N 3°32′55″E
Northern curtain wall of the Bout Tower	Private property	Partially visible from Rue de la Coutellerie (where buildings destroyed in 2012 revealed the presence of this wall)	
For all the points mentioned on this page: view on OpenStreetMap archive, Bing Cartes archive, or download in KML format.

==== Square Tower of the Chancellery ====
The Chancellery Tower, constructed as early as the 11th century, represents the northern exit of the "murailhe de palais du Chastel." The building's name has its origins in the 15th century. It is now highly visible from Rue du Pirou and the beginning of Place du Palais, also known as Place Saint-Genès. The shape of the entrance is highlighted by the stones that reinforce the contours of the main door. It is currently the oldest inhabited house in the entire town.

==== Pedde Saint-Genès ====
In Thiers, a "pedde" is a passageway that traverses a street or alley at varying elevations. The Pedde Saint-Genès was originally a gateway of the initial enclosure, though it was constructed with openings around the 17th century to facilitate commerce between the original village and the subsequent expansions of the town to the east. Presently, this pedde persists between Rue Mancel-Chabot and Place du Palais.

==== Clock Tower ====
Following a renovation project completed in 2017, the tower is now more visible from Place du Pirou as a result of the raised roof. The lower part of the tower is constructed from granite stones, while the upper part is topped with a brown wooden structure with small openings closed by wooden shutters painted red.

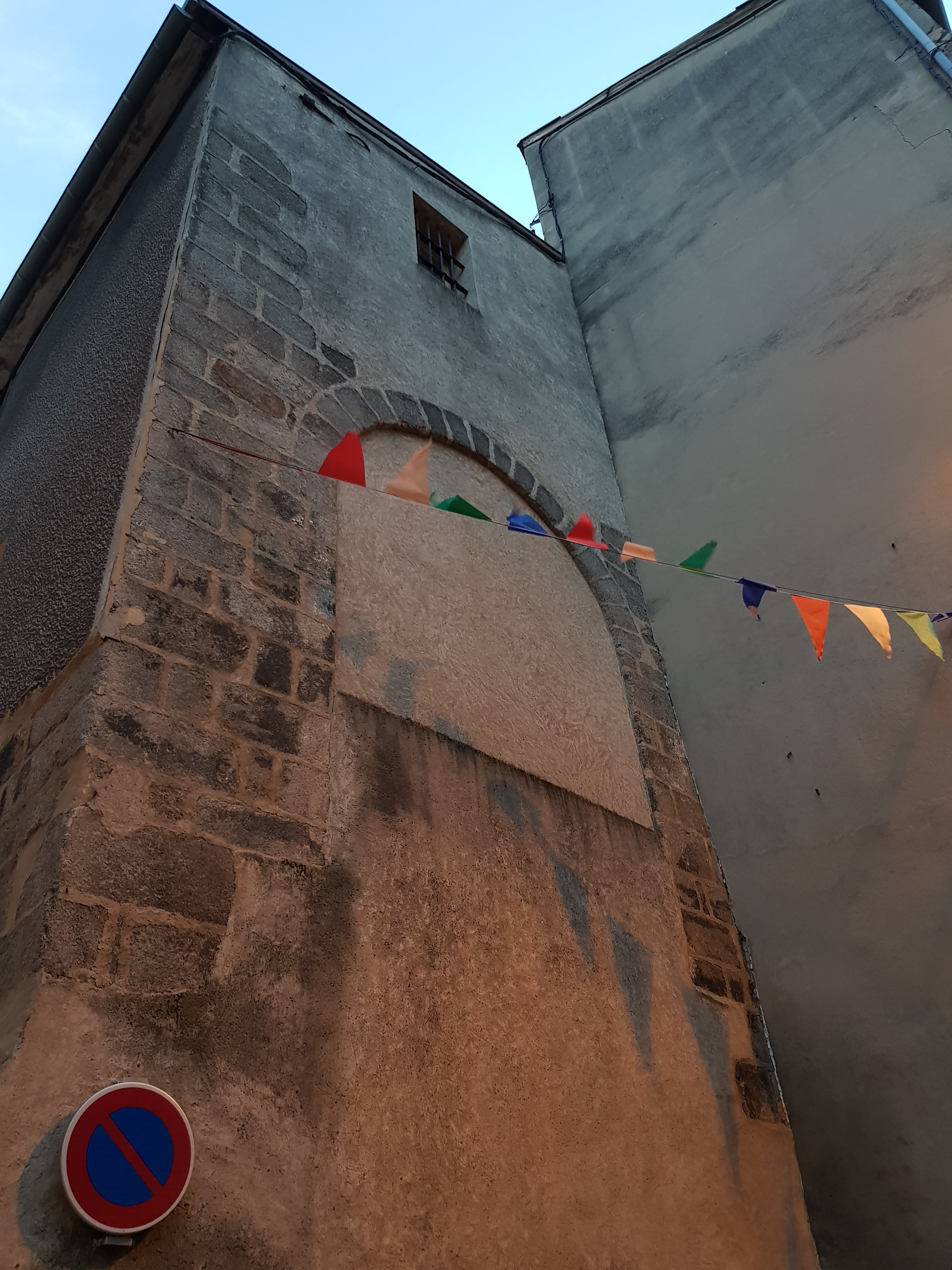
The square tower of the Chancellery.

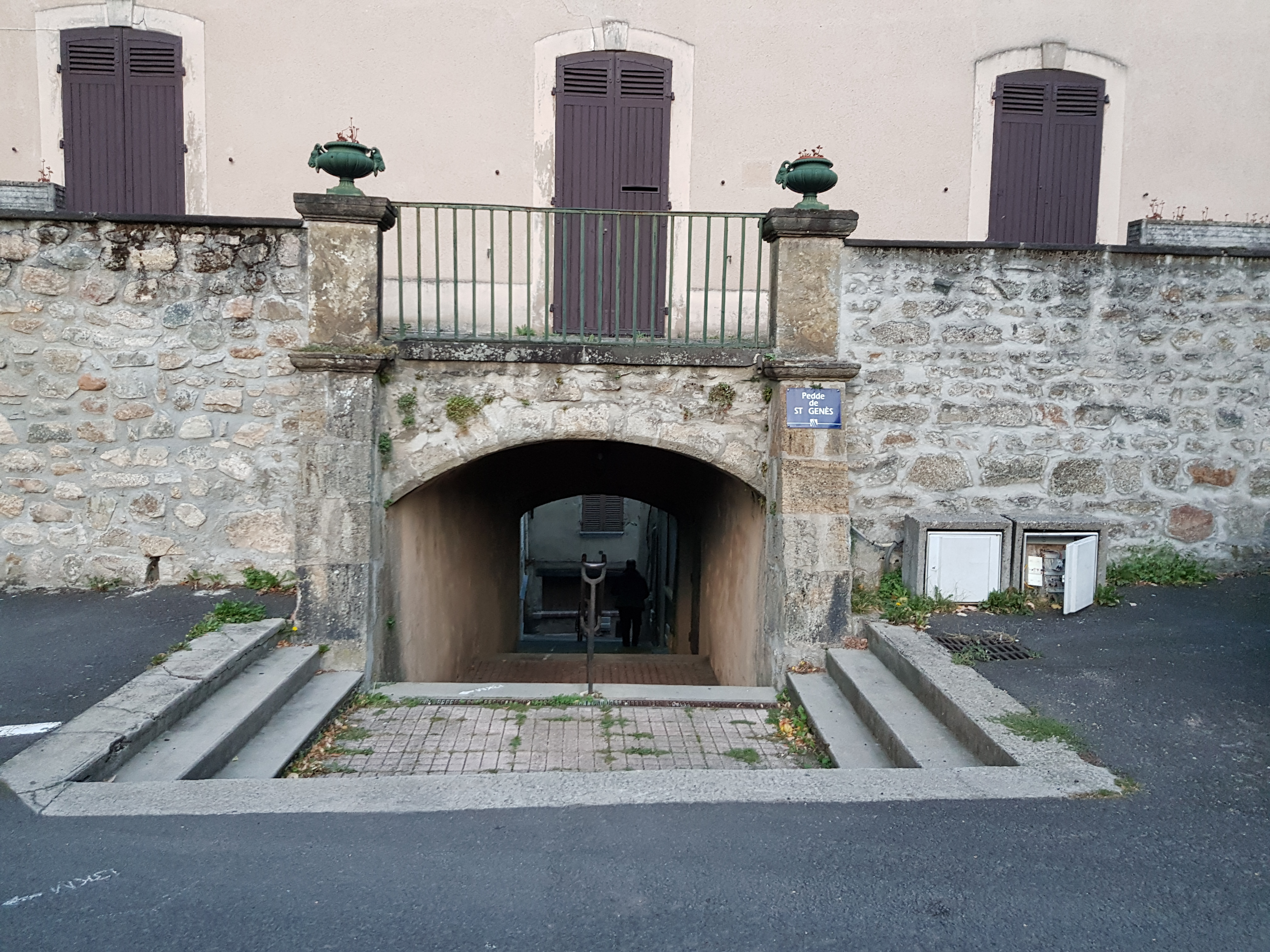
The Saint-Genès pedde.

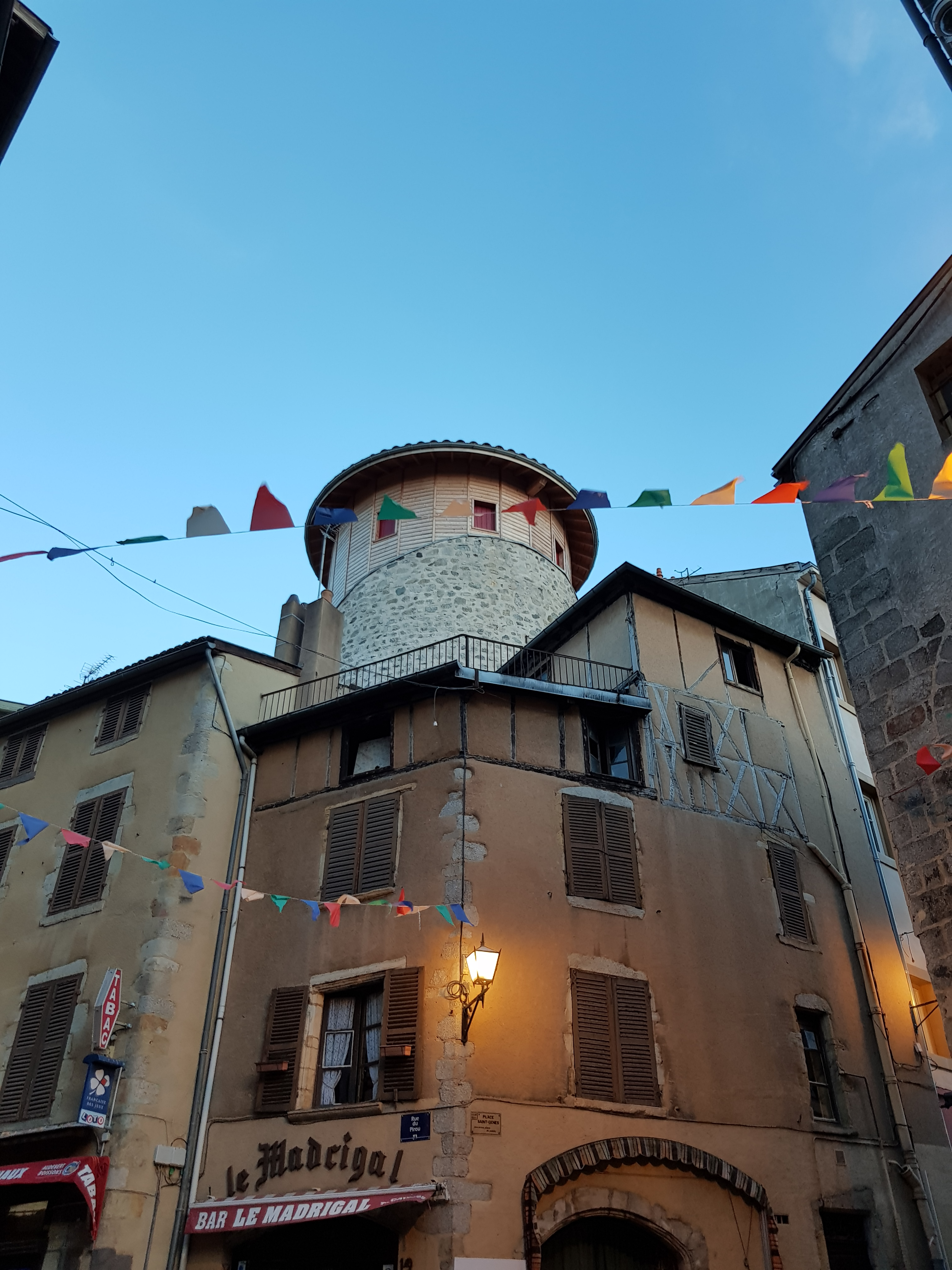
The clock tower.

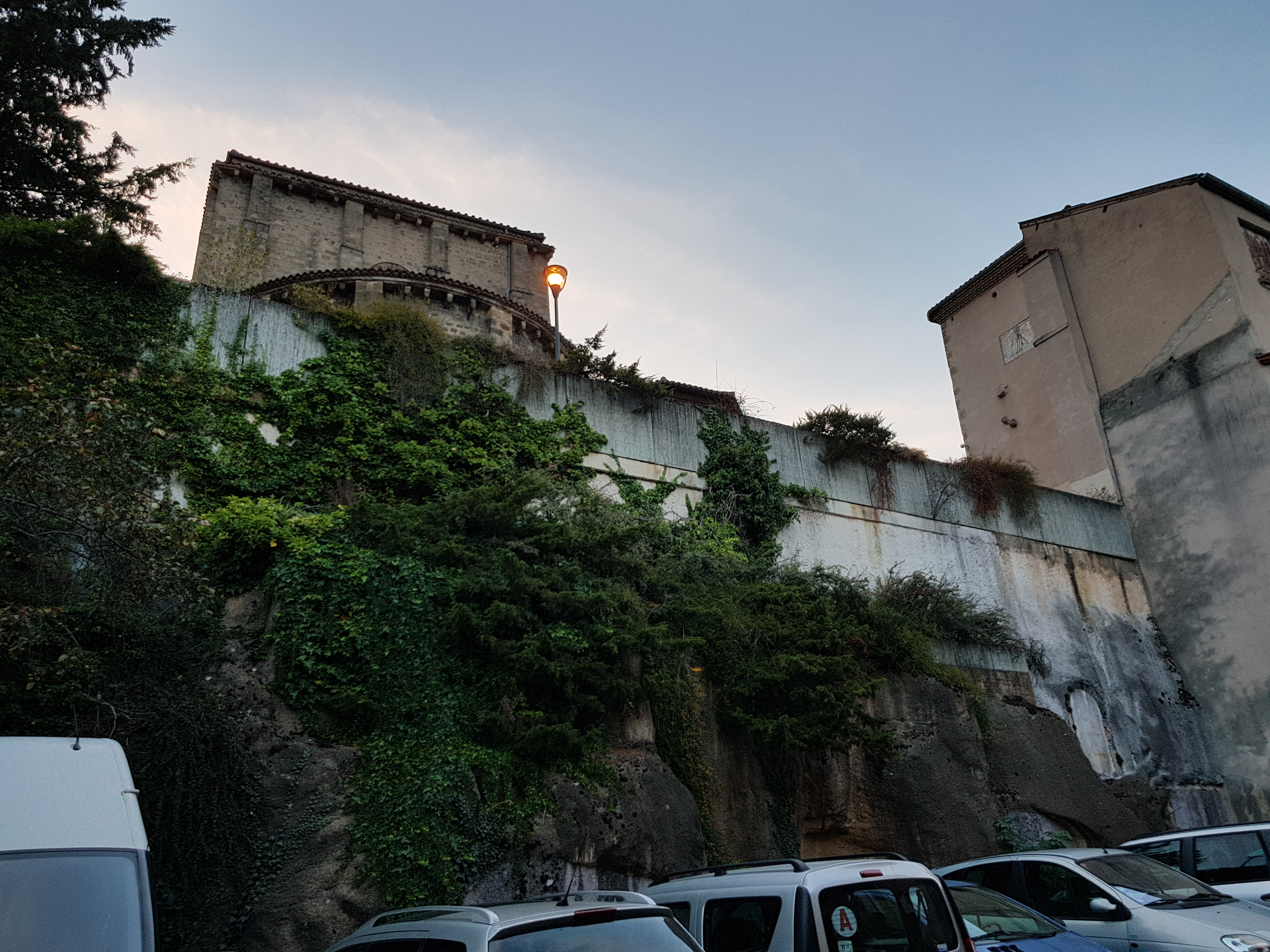
Traces of the first wall behind the church of Saint-Genès

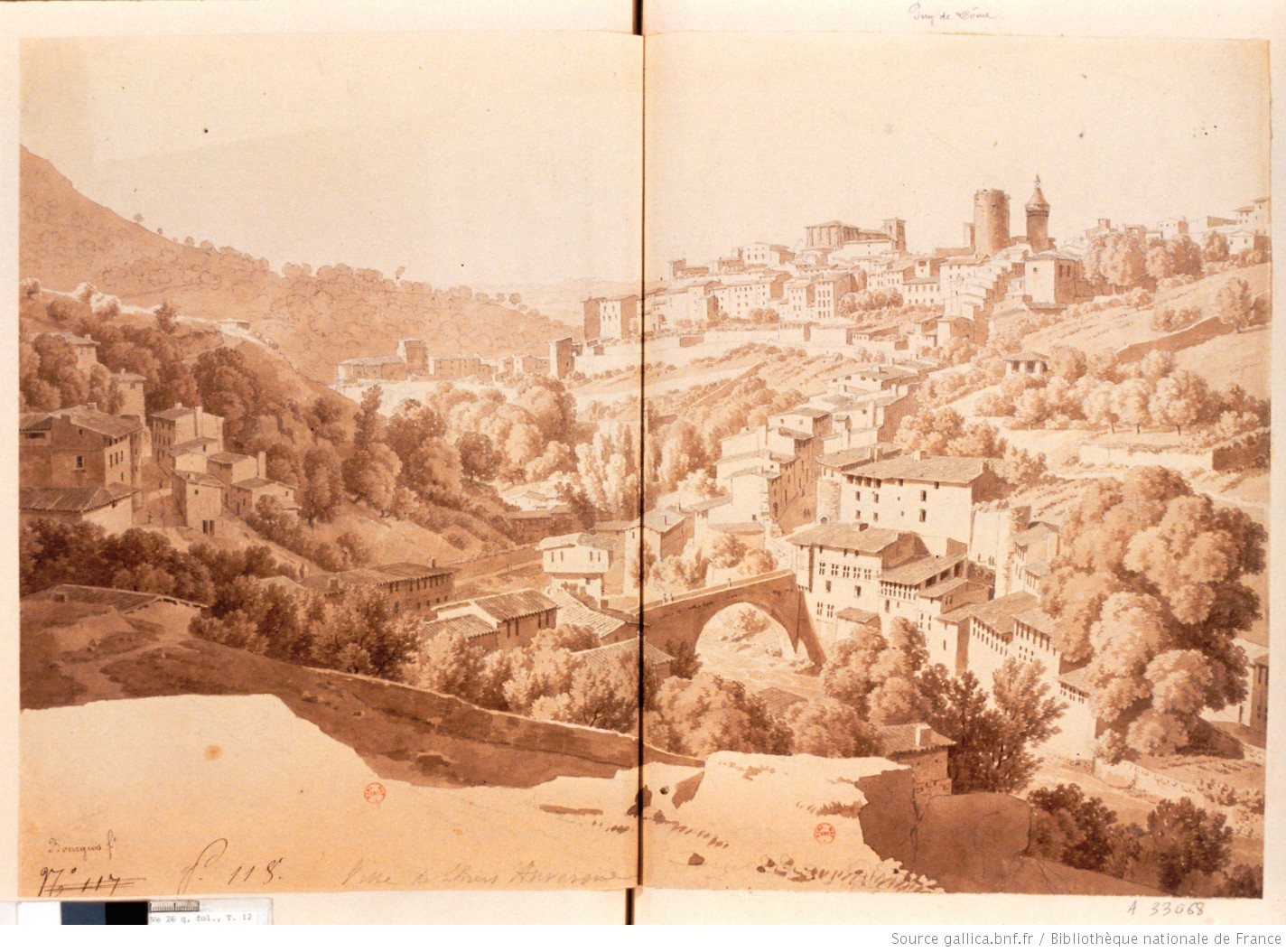
The town of Thiers in the 18th century. The castle keep and clock tower can be seen in the top right-hand corner of the image.

=== Second enclosure ===
Synthesis of the second enclosure
Element	Owner	Accessibility	Coordinates
Charnier Gate/Pedde du Coin des Hasards	Private property, public road	Integrated into the urban space Fairly well preserved, passage underneath accessible to pedestrians and vehicles	45°51′15″N 3°32′54″E
Southern curtain wall of the Maistre Raymond Tower	Private property	Integrated into the urban space Partially visible from the courtyard behind the Tribunal	
Maistre Raymond Tower	Private property City of Thiers	Very well preserved, visible from the lower part of Rue Alexandre-Dumas and the upper part of Rue Durolle	45°51′16″N 3°32′55″E
Southern curtain wall of the Pignat Tower	Private property	Integrated into the urban space Hidden behind buildings on Rue Alexandre-Dumas	
Pignat Tower	Private property City of Thiers	Very well preserved, highlighted on Rue Alexandre-Dumas during the 2018 renovation works	45°51′17″N 3°32′54″E
Southern curtain wall of the Montauld Tower	Private property	Integrated into the urban space Hidden behind buildings on Rue Alexandre-Dumas	
Montauld Tower	Private property	Partially visible from the roof of the Municipal Media Library of Thiers	45°51′18″N 3°32′53″E
Salement Gate	Public road	Small wall section visible from the beginning of Rue de la Coutellerie	45°51′14″N 3°32′51″E
Watch Tower	Private property	Visible from Rue Alexandre-Dumas	45°51′16″N 3°32′54″E
For all the points mentioned on this page: view on OpenStreetMap archive, Bing Cartes archive, or download in KML format.

==== Charnier Gate and Pedde du Coin des Hasards ====
The structure comprises a gate and a covered passageway connecting two buildings situated above an alleyway. This architectural ensemble is emblematic of a "pedde" in Thiers, and it is designated as Charnier Gate, which was originally part of the Maistre Raymond Tower. The structure is attached to the north side of the Maistre Raymond Tower (13th century) and the south side of a former entrance to the seigneurial castle of Thiers. The pedde has four floors, with the smallest floor situated at the lowest level and the largest at the top (fourth floor). As is the case with numerous half-timbered houses, the pedde's floors are constructed with corbel arches.

==== Maistre Raymond Tower ====
Following extensive renovations in the early 21st century, the Maistre Raymond Tower is now largely visible from the small square it overlooks. It comprises four upper floors constructed on a ground floor that is fully accessible to the public via a large porch supported by a stone vault.

==== Pignat Tower ====
The Pignat Tower is the most imposing of the second enclosure due to its diameter, which exceeds 10 metres, a relatively large diameter in comparison to the other towers. In 2018, the tower was renovated, and its original colour (faded red) was replaced with white, which makes the tower more visible from the street.

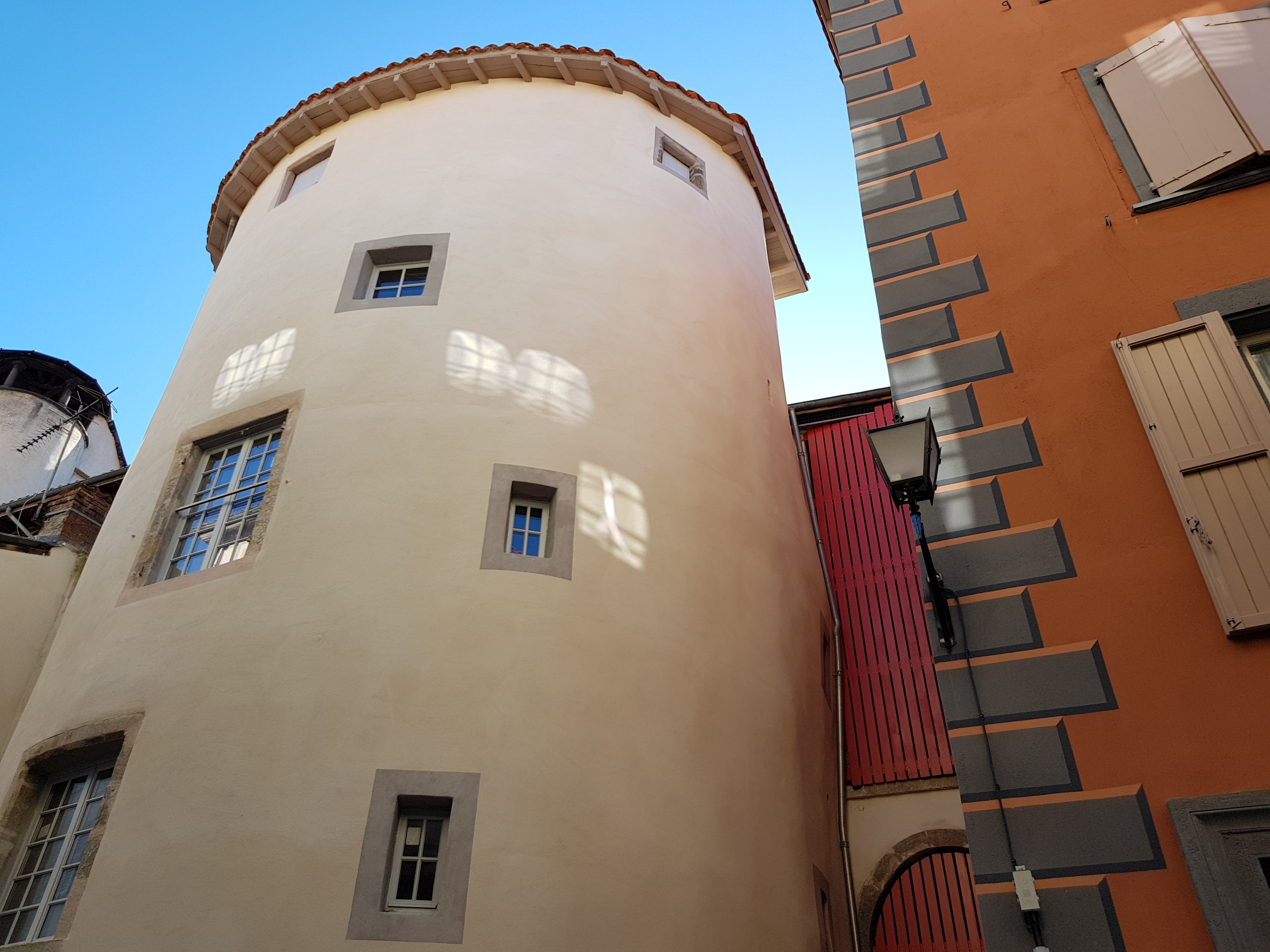
The Pignat tower.

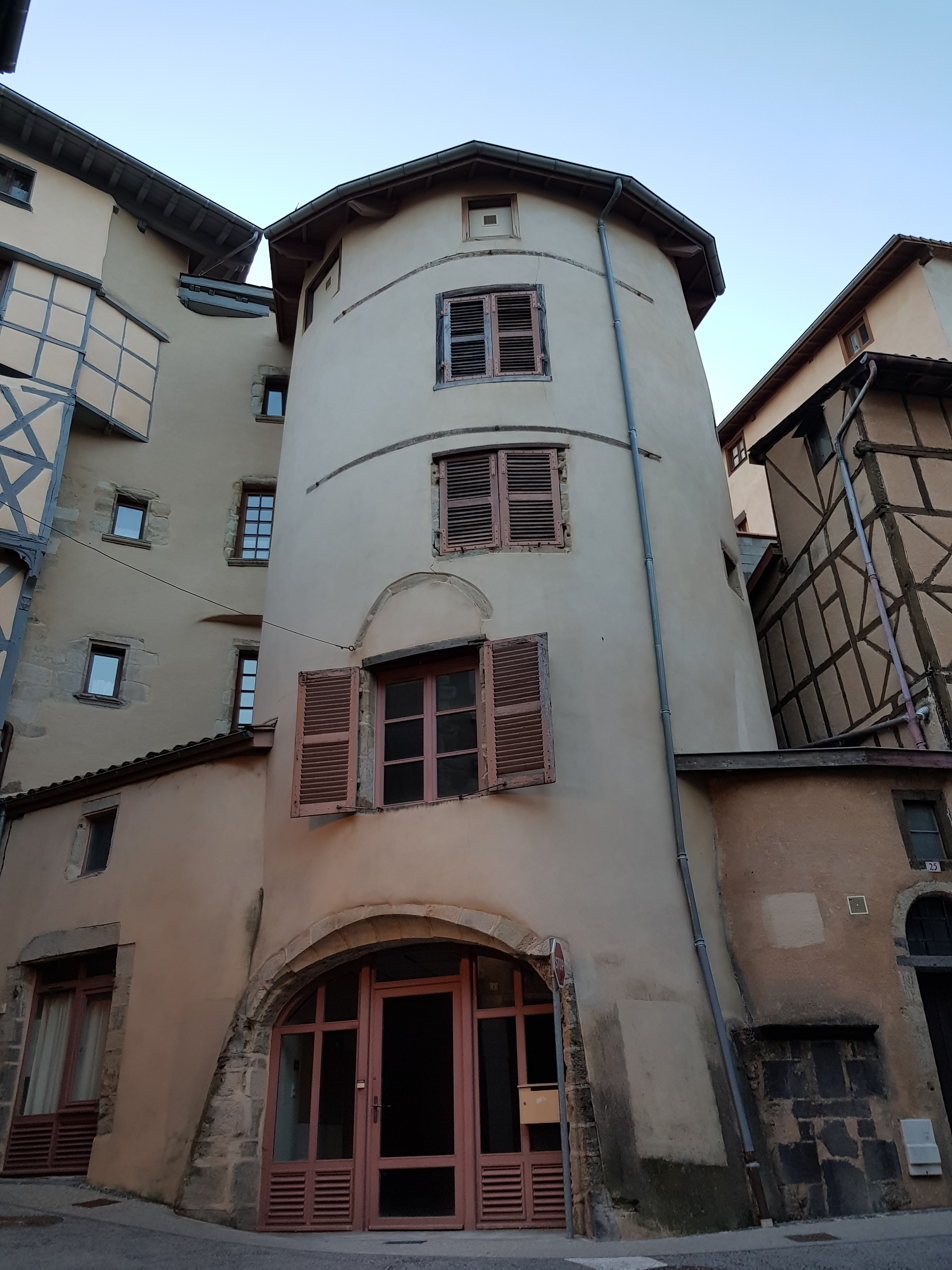
The Maistre Raymond tower.

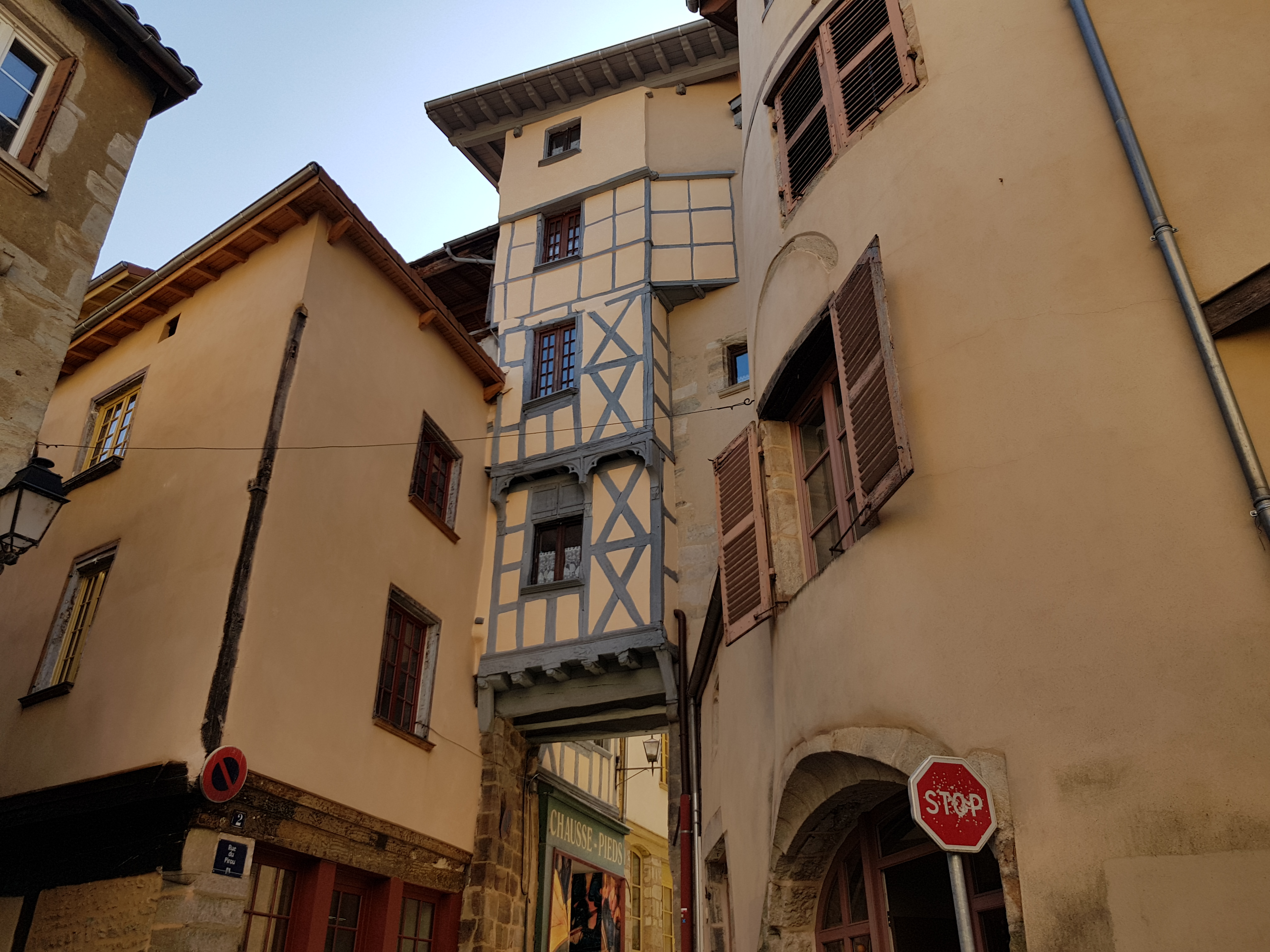
The rear of the Pedde du Coin des Hasards.

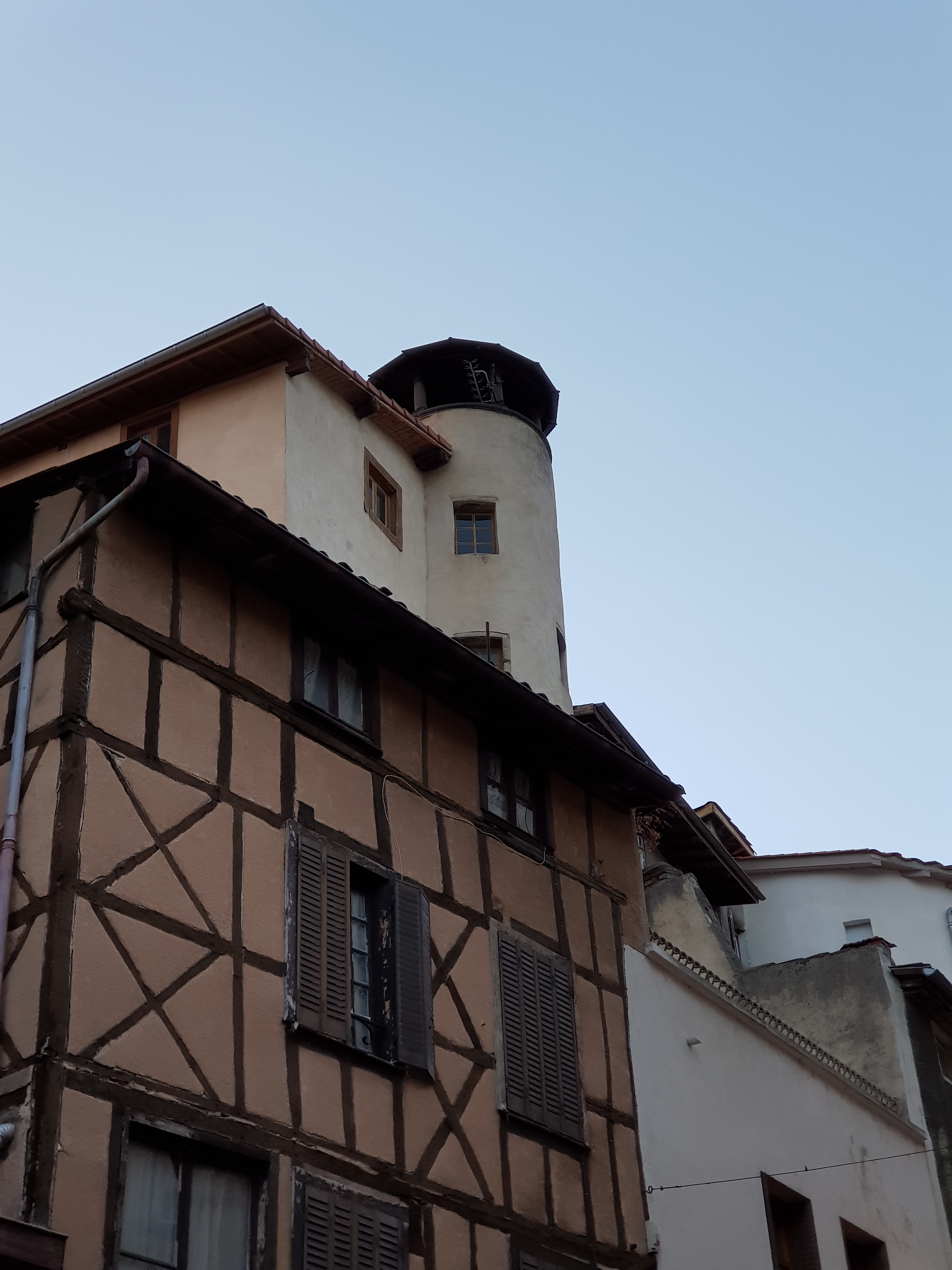
The Watch Tower.

=== Third enclosure ===
The third enclosure is the smallest in the city in terms of the area it protects. It comprises a tower, situated at the corner of Rue du Docteur Lachamp and Rue de la Faye, which has three floors. It is the smallest of the towers, with a diameter of just over 3 meters, and contains a staircase allowing residents of the outer districts to enter the fortified town.

Synthesis of the third enclosure
Element	Owner	Accessibility	Coordinates
Southern curtain wall of the Chastelain Tower	Private property	Integrated into the urban space	
Tower 3	Private property City of Thiers	Very well preserved, visible from Rue du Docteur-Lachamp	45°51′10″N 3°32′49″E
Curtain wall 1	Private property	Integrated into the urban space	
Southern curtain wall of the Limagne or Lymagne Gate	Private property	Integrated into the urban space, very visible from the lower part of Rue du Docteur-Lachamp	
Northern curtain wall of the Limagne or Lymagne Gate	Private property	Integrated into the urban space, very visible from the middle of Rue du Docteur-Lachamp	
For all the points mentioned on this page: view on OpenStreetMap archive, Bing Cartes archive, or download in KML format.

=== Fourth enclosure ===
Synthesis of the fourth enclosure
Element	Owner	Accessibility	Coordinates
Porte Malorie	Public road	Urban integration Beginning of the vault and narrowing of the alley indicating the presence of a medieval gate between the bottom of Rue Gambetta and the top of Rue Rouget-de-l'Isle	45°51′12″N 3°32′45″E
North curtain wall of Malorie Tower	Public road	Very visible from rue Chauchat	
Malorie Tower	Private property	Very well preserved, visible from the bottom of rue Gambetta and the top of rue Rouget-de-l'Isle	45°51′12″N 3°32′44″E
Southeast curtain wall of Coagne Tower	Public road	Very visible from rue Anna-Chabrol	
Coagne Gate	Public road	Partially preserved, support wall still visible near Place de Coagne	45°51′08″N 3°32′48″E
North curtain wall of Saint-Jean Gate	Public road	Very visible from rue des Murailles	
Coagne Tower	Private property	Fully preserved, restored in 2016	45°51′05″N 3°32′53″E
South curtain wall of Tower 3	Public road	Very visible from rue des Treilles, across from Centre A school	
Saint-Jean Gate	Public road	Urban integration Beginning of the vault and narrowing of the alley indicating the presence of a medieval gate	45°51′04″N 3°32′59″E
South curtain wall of Neufve Gate	Public road	Partially destroyed Visible from rue Prosper-Marilhat	
South curtain wall of Alepit Tower	Public road	Very visible from rue de la Bienfaisance	
Alepit II Tower	Private property	Visible between rue Terrasse and rue de la Bienfaisance	
For all the points mentioned on this page: view on OpenStreetMap archive, Bing Cartes archive, or download in KML format.

==== Malorie Tower ====
Malorie Tower is in the lowest altitude among other towers situated at a higher elevation. It is also one of the most well-preserved, exhibiting preserved arrow slits close to the ground on the right side. Additionally, the tower marks the entrance to an underground passageway connecting the summit of Rue Rouget-de-l'Isle to the Chastel Palace, an early 11th-century structure. This entrance is currently visible from the street, although it is enclosed by a fence.

==== Saint-Jean Gate ====
The gate was annexed in the 16th century to the church of the same name and can still be observed from the bottom of Place Saint-Jean. A suggestion of a vault is visible between the church and the remainder of the wall. Two unaltered rectangular windows remain in the continuation of the gate: one on the side of Rue des Murailles and the other in a building attached to the church. These apertures served as vents for the discharge of flammable liquids, thereby repelling enemies approaching the gate.

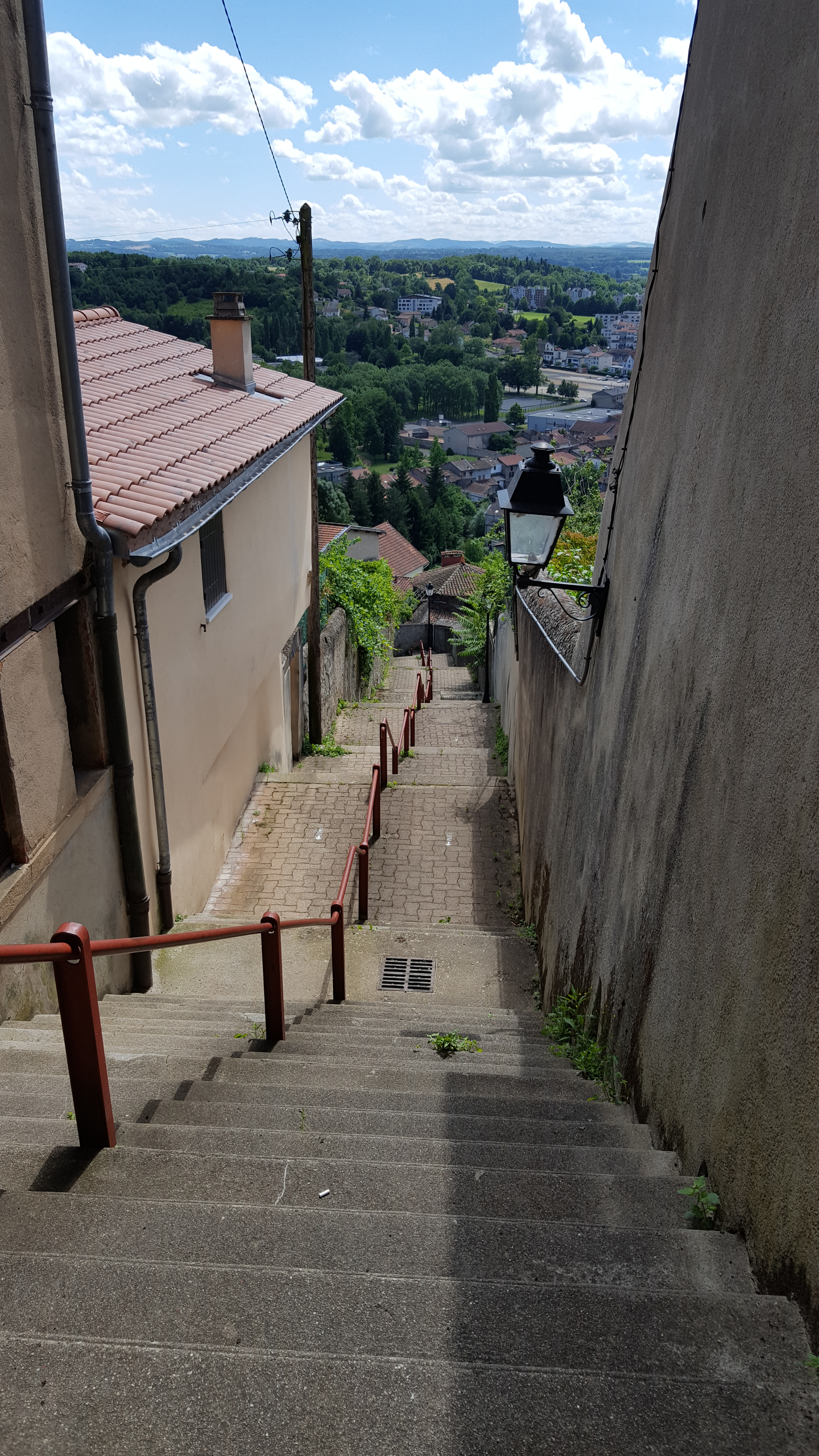
Rue Chauchat with part of the fourth wall on the right.

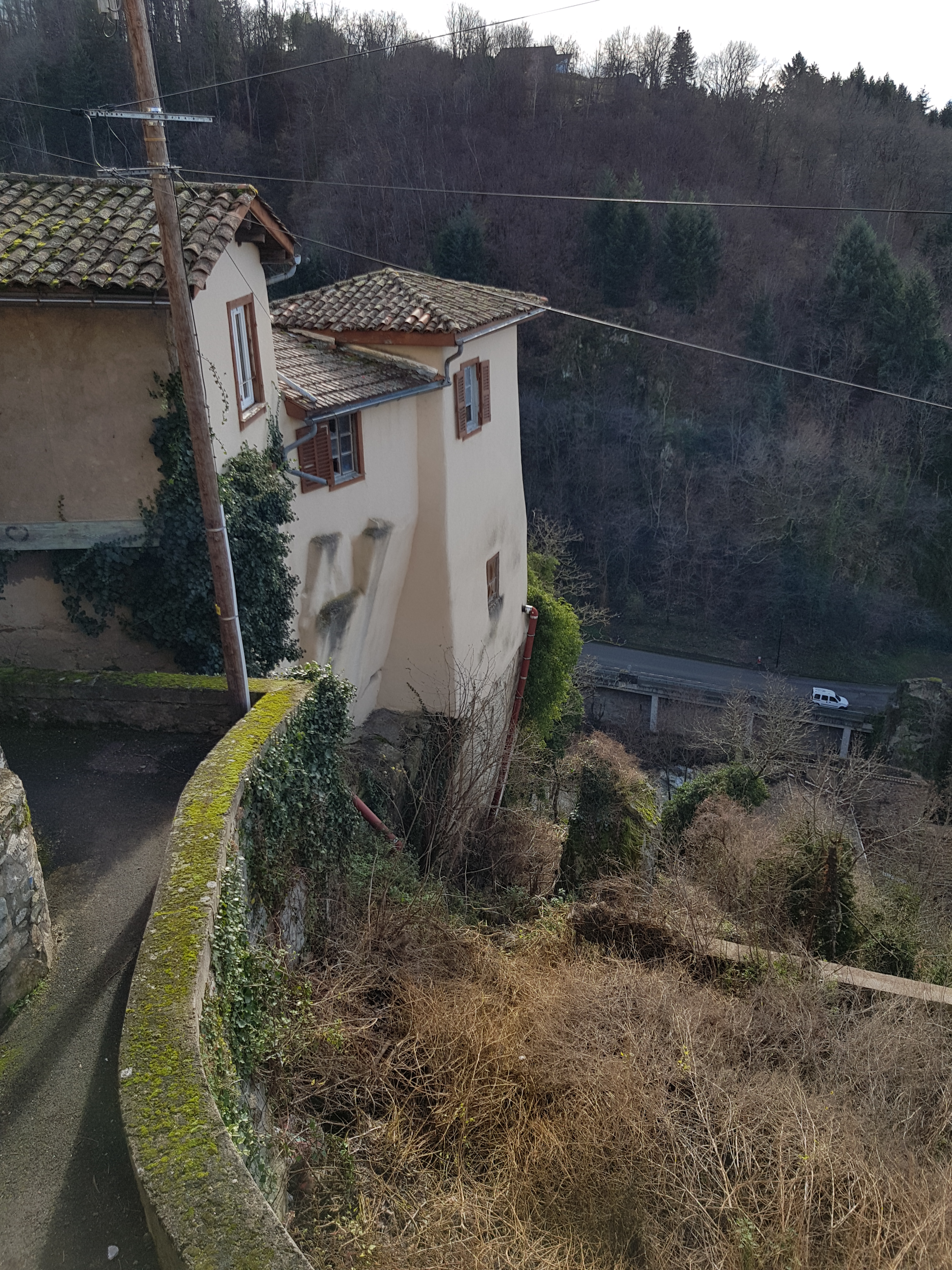
The Coagne tower overlooking the Vallée des Usines, taken in 2018.

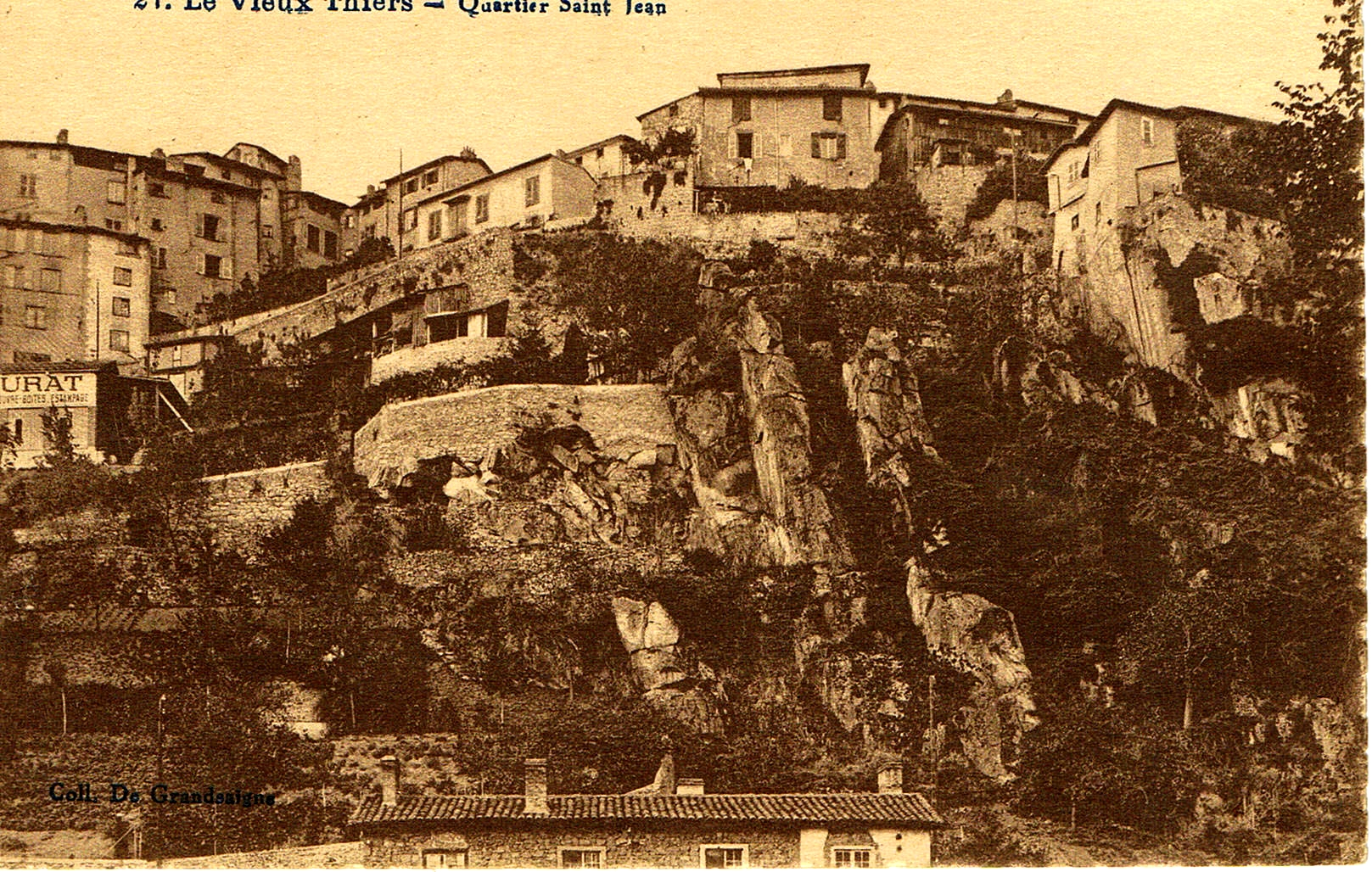
Part of the fourth enclosure with the Coagne tower on the right in 1910.

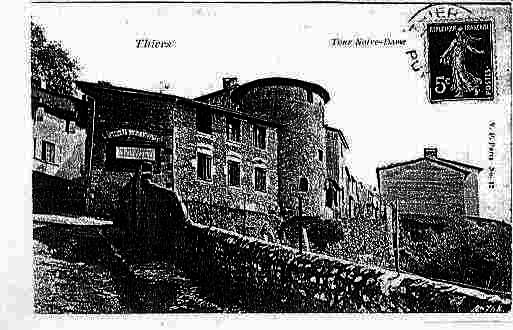
The Malorie tower at the end of the 19th century.

=== Fifth Enclosure ===
Synthesis of the fifth enclosure
Element	Owner	Accessibility	Coordinates
Church of Saint-Jean in Thiers	Private property City of Thiers	Church integrated into the wall, closed to the public	45°51′04″N 3°32′58″E
Curtain wall of the Church of Saint-Jean	Private property City of Thiers	Church integrated into the wall	
South curtain wall of Seychal Gate	Private property City of Thiers	Very visible from the north part of rue des Murailles	
Seychal Gate	Public road	Partially preserved, support wall still visible from Place du Corps-de-Garde and rue Durolle	45°51′17″N 3°32′59″E
North curtain wall of Seychal Gate	Private property City of Thiers	Very visible from the primary school of Centre A	
For all the points mentioned on this page: view on OpenStreetMap archive, Bing Cartes archive, or download in KML format.

==== Saint-Jean Church ====
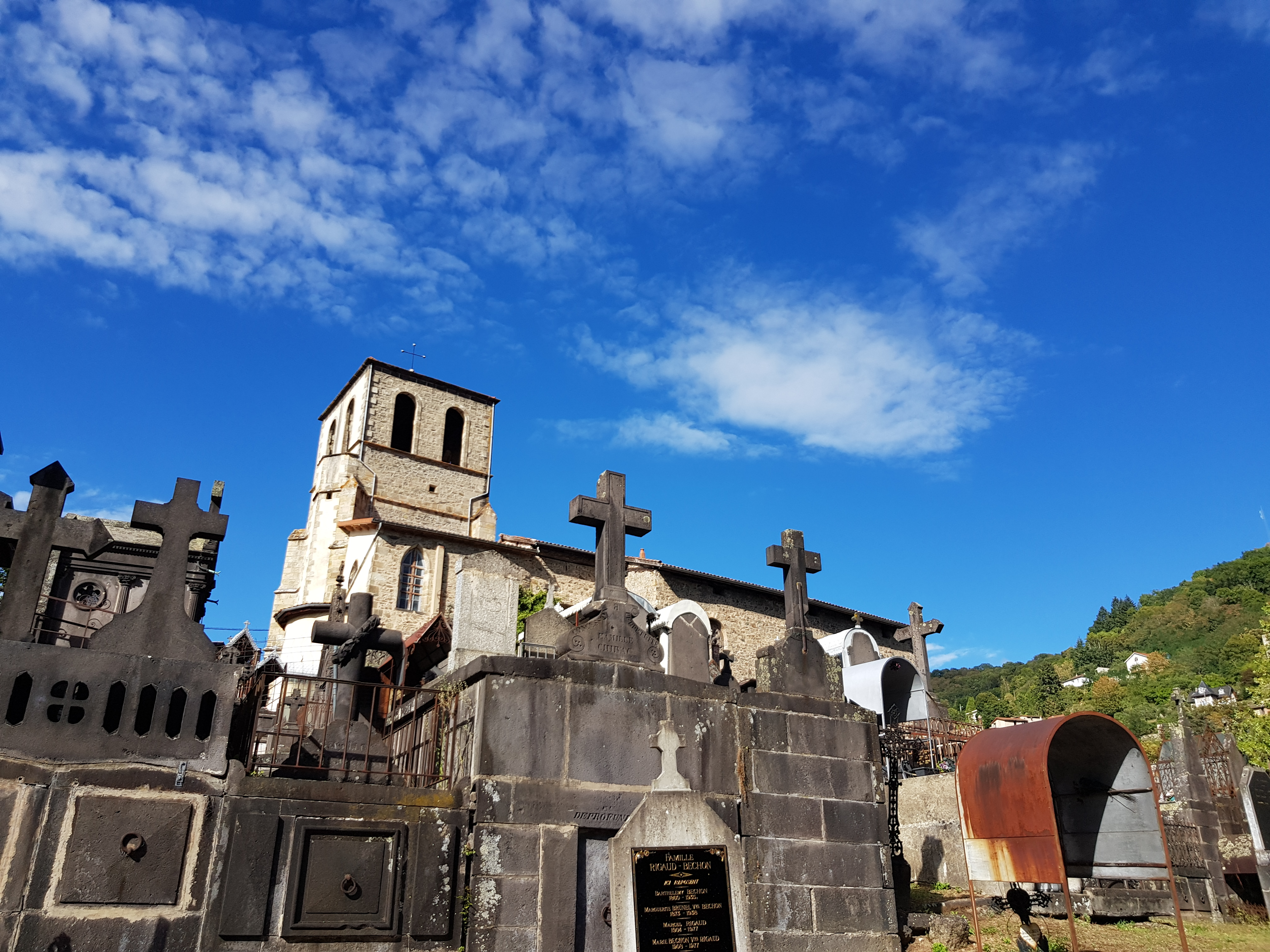
Saint-Jean du Passet church and cemetery in August 2020.

The church, originally constructed in the Romanesque style, was destroyed and subsequently rebuilt in the 15th century in the Gothic style. However, it was then incorporated into the fortifications in the following century, forming part of the comprehensive closure of the final enclosure. The dual purpose of the church is still evident at the rear of the choir, where the walls are reinforced.

== Disappeared elements ==
=== First enclosure ===
Elements located on the path of the first enclosure
Element	Location	Notes
Chapter Tower	Rue Mancel-Chabot	This tower was protected by the "Brayette du Chastel," a type of defense preventing enemies from approaching the tower. Its usefulness was questioned during the construction of the fourth enclosure and it was then destroyed, making way for new dwellings.
Bout Tower and Gate	Petite Rue du Palais	This tower was originally built along the only path leading visitors to the town and its fortified castle. It was accompanied by a gate that shares its name.

=== Second enclosure ===
Elements located on the path of the second enclosure
Element	Location	Notes
Bourg Portal	Rue du Bourg	This gate allowed visitors to enter via a drawbridge overlooking the "Rif des Boucheries," which flows at the bottom of a ravine. This became National road 89 in the 19th century.
City Tower	Rue Lasteyras	This tower – likely square-shaped – was built in the 13th century at the end of Rue Lasteyras, which formed after successive city expansions.
Tower Under the Market Hall	Place des Martyrs de la Déportation	This tower was originally built under a market hall, hence its name. Upon its construction, it was the lowest tower in the city in terms of altitude before the fourth enclosure was built.

=== Third enclosure ===
Elements located on the path of the third enclosure
Element	Location	Notes
Tower 1	Rue de la Coutellerie	Small tower in the lower part of Rue de la Coutellerie.
Tower 2	Place Lafayette	Tower at what is now the site of the second part of the Cutlery Museum overlooking Place Lafayette.
Limagne or Lymagne Gate	Rue du Docteur-Lachamp	Gate providing access to the city via the Limagne plain.

=== Fourth enclosure ===
Elements located on the path of the fourth enclosure
Element	Location	Notes
Poule Tower	Place Duchasseint	Tower located just above a water source that supplied part of the city.
City Tower	Rue François-Mitterrand	Tower destroyed in the 19th century for the passage of Route Impériale No. 89.
Lac Portal	Rue François-Mitterrand	Gate destroyed in the 19th century for the passage of Route Impériale No. 89.
Neufve Gate	Place Belfort	Gate destroyed in the 19th century for the passage of Route Impériale No. 106.
Alepit I Tower	Rue Prospère-Marilhat	Tower destroyed in the 19th century for the passage of Rue Prospère-Marilhat.
Tower Under the Hospital	Thiers old hospital	Tower destroyed to expand the maternity ward and emergency room of the hospital at the end of the 19th century.
Town Hall Tower	Place Antonin-Chastel	Tower destroyed in the 19th century for the passage of Route Impériale No. 89.
Lyon Gate	Rue Durolle	Gate destroyed to widen Rue Durolle.

== In the arts ==
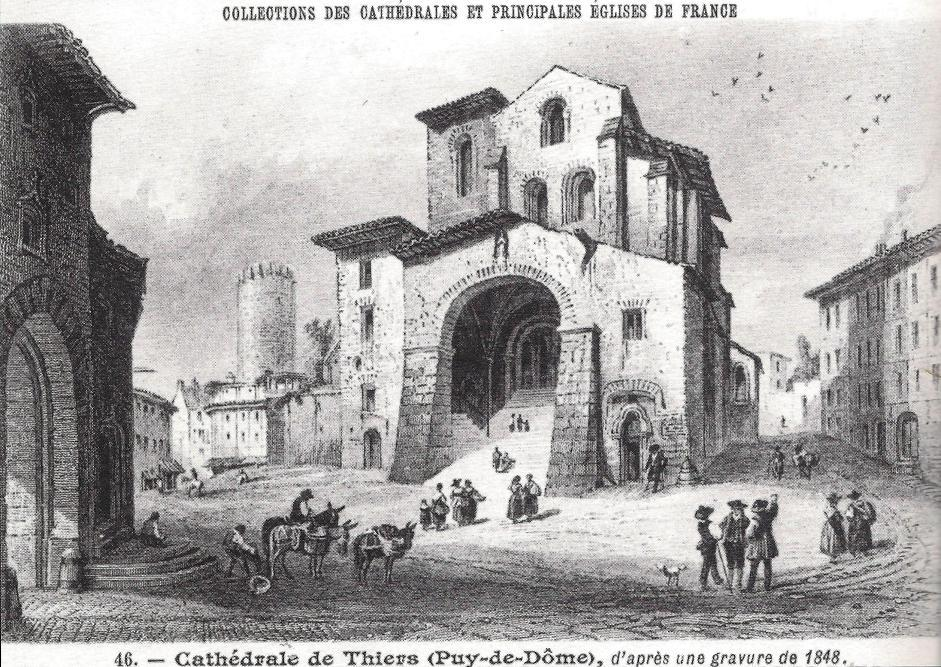
Representation of the church of Saint-Genès (then a cathedral) with the Porte de la Bout on the left and the clock tower in the background between the Porte de la Bout and the church.

The medieval town's ramparts, particularly the eastern and southern walls, are regarded as a symbol by travelers and artists. They are situated in an atypical landscape, which is regularly painted, drawn, and photographed, especially for illustrating tourist guides and as subjects of postcards. This landscape is formed by the ramparts, the landscaped gardens of the Old Hospital in the foreground, and the old town and Saint-Genès Church in the background.

In 1861, during her travels through the town, the French writer George Sand composed a novel about the work of the Thiers cutlers. She referred to the town's ramparts as a writing surface where a certain Audebert had inscribed "words in charcoal." In 2017, the painter Monik Durand-Pradat created a series of paintings depicting various neighborhoods within the town. These included representations of still-visible parts of the ramparts, such as the Maistre Raymond Tower and the Pedde du Coin des Hasards. In the same year, Anthony Mage created a painting of the town from the perspective of Margerides Rock. The ramparts along Rue des Murailles are a prominent feature of this work. Hubert Jaqueton described the town of Thiers as follows: "From the summit of Grun de la Pierre-qui-danse, tourists can survey the entire townscape. They can also observe the towers that once protected the castle's enclosure and the enormous keep with its broken crenellations."

== Bibliography ==
- Collectif (2007). Mythologie française : bulletin de la Société de mythologie française (in French). Clermont-Ferrand: Société de mythologie française. p. 14. Archived from the original on October 2, 2024.
- Drillon, Caroline; Ricard, Marie-Claire (2012). L'Auvergne Pour les Nuls (in French). Clermont-Ferrand: edi8. p. 344. ISBN 978-2-7540-4485-1. Archived from the original on March 18, 2023.
- Fournier, Gabriel (1962). Le peuplement rural en Basse Auvergne durant le haut Moyen ge (in French). Clermont-Ferrand: Presses Universitaires de France. p. 587.
- Fournier, Gabriel; Revel, Guillaume (1973). Châteaux, villages et villes d'Auvergne au 15e siècle d'après l'Armorial de Guillaume Revel (in French). Clermont-Ferrand: Arts et Métiers Graphiques. p. 124.
- Groisne, Daniel; Therre, Georges; Ytournel, Jacques (1979). Thiers en cartes postales anciennes (in French). Thiers: Ville de Thiers. p. 49. ISBN 90-288-0153-7.
- Hédiard, Germain (1906). Eugéne Isabey : étude suivie du catalogue de son oeuvre (in French). Clermont-Ferrand: Delteil. p. 36.
- Laffont, Pierre-Yves (2011). L'armorial de Guillaume Revel : châteaux, villes et bourgs du Forez au XVe siècle (in French). Thiers: Association de liaison pour le patrimoine et l'archéologie en Rhône-Alpes et en Auvergne. ISBN 978-2-916125-05-3. Archived from the original on July 7, 2024.
- Syndicat d'initiative (1898). L'Auvergne : guide (in French). L'Auvergne : guide: L'Auvergne : guide. p. 61. Archived from the original on October 2, 2024.
