= Church of Saint-Genès, Thiers =

12th-century church in Puy-de-Dôme, France

Coordinates: 45.8533°N 3.5483°E

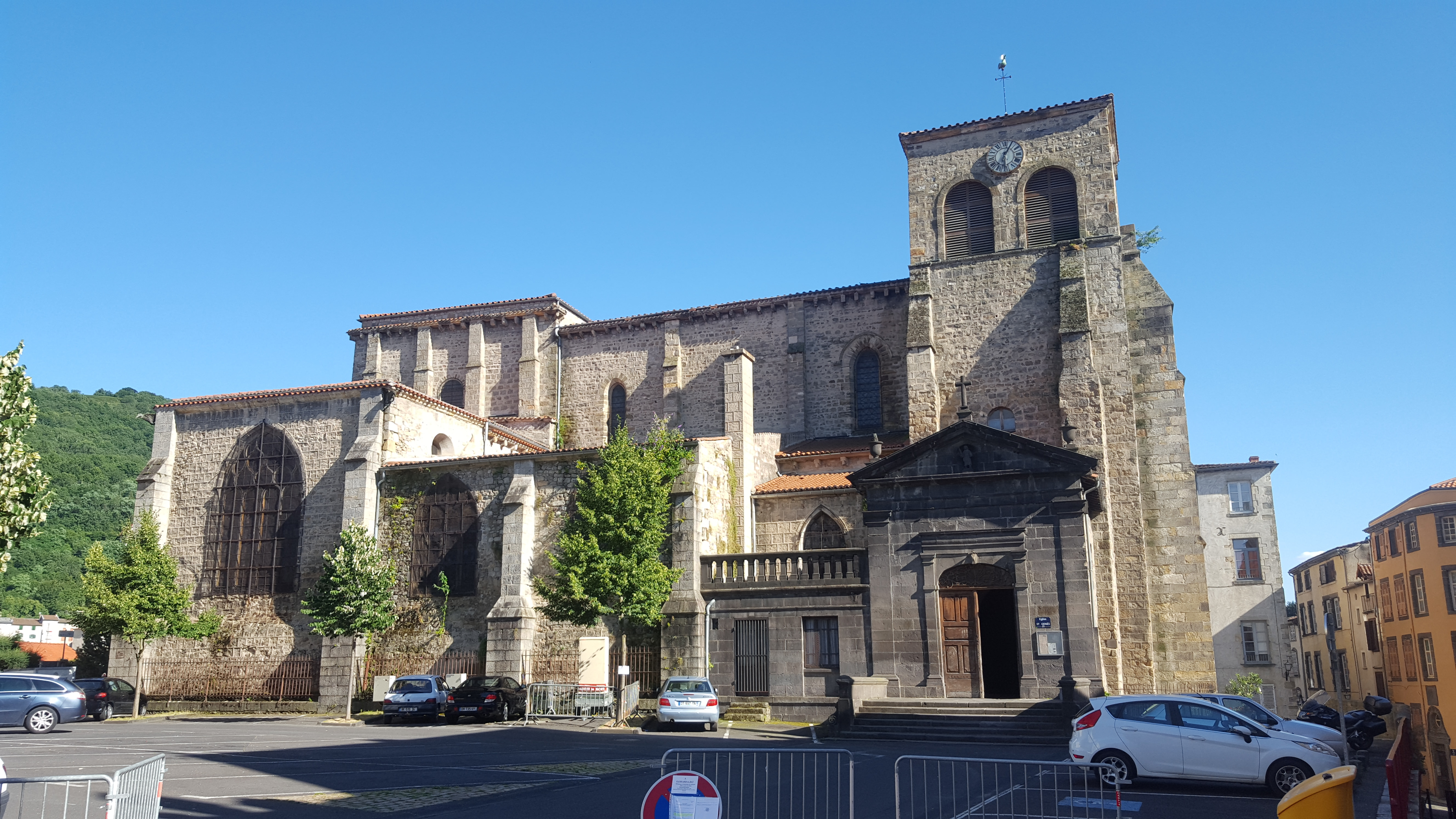
The church in 2017

The Church of Saint-Genès (French: Église Saint-Genès de Thiers) is a 12th-century, former collegiate church dedicated to the local martyr Saint Genesius of Thiers (Saint Genès) and situated in the medieval city of Thiers in the department of Puy-de-Dôme in France. The church combines Romanesque and Gothic architecture and possesses the biggest dome of Auvergne with a surface of 102m².

== See also ==
- Thiers old hospital
- Thiers ramparts
- Church of St John, Thiers
