= Thiers old hospital =

Historic building in Thiers, France

- Ancien hôpital de Thiers (French)
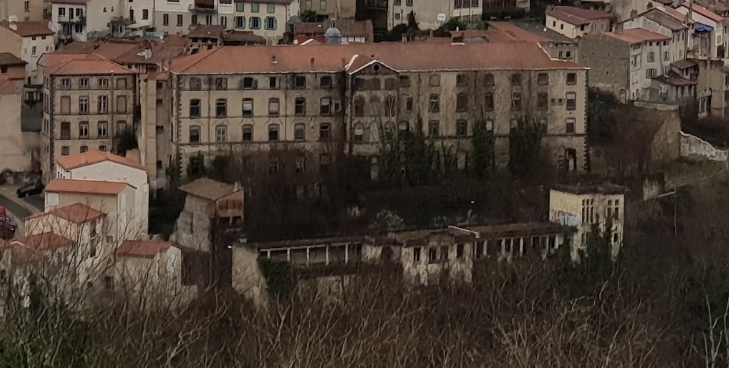
- The old hospital seen from the village of La Vidalie in 2018.

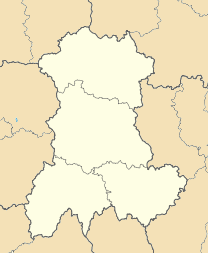
- Location within Auvergne Location within France
- 45°51′09″N 3°32′57″E
- Location: Department of Puy-de-Dôme; Auvergne-Rhône-Alpes Region; Thiers Commune; France

History
- Closure: 1988
- Founded: 1668
- Built: 1660, and opened on 1669

Site notes
- Architectural style: Neoclassic
- Owner: City of Thiers

Thiers old hospital (Ancien hôpital de Thiers, in French) is the former site of a hospital dating back to the 17th century, located in the eastern part of the historic center of Thiers, France. The site covers an area of 0.5 ha, and the buildings cover more than 7,000 m². It is located within the perimeter of Thiers' site patrimonial remarquable (remarkable heritage site), and remains protected under the town's Plan de sauvegarde et de mise en valeur (Protection and Enhancement Plan). Like the rest of Thiers' old town, the site has underground passages and cellars.

Closed in 1988 following the hospital's move to new premises at the Thiers hospital center, the site remained partially abandoned before being totally abandoned following the departure of the medical-psychological consultation center in 2016.

== Location ==
Thiers old hospital is located in the French department of Puy-de-Dôme, in the commune of Thiers. Located to the east of the town's medieval heart, it is built on top of part of the 4th wall of the Thiers city walls, which serves as a retaining wall. The hospital overlooks the Vallée des Usines and the surrounding historic center. The building is not visible when entering the town from the west, being hidden by medieval buildings and the Saint-Genès church just a few metres away.

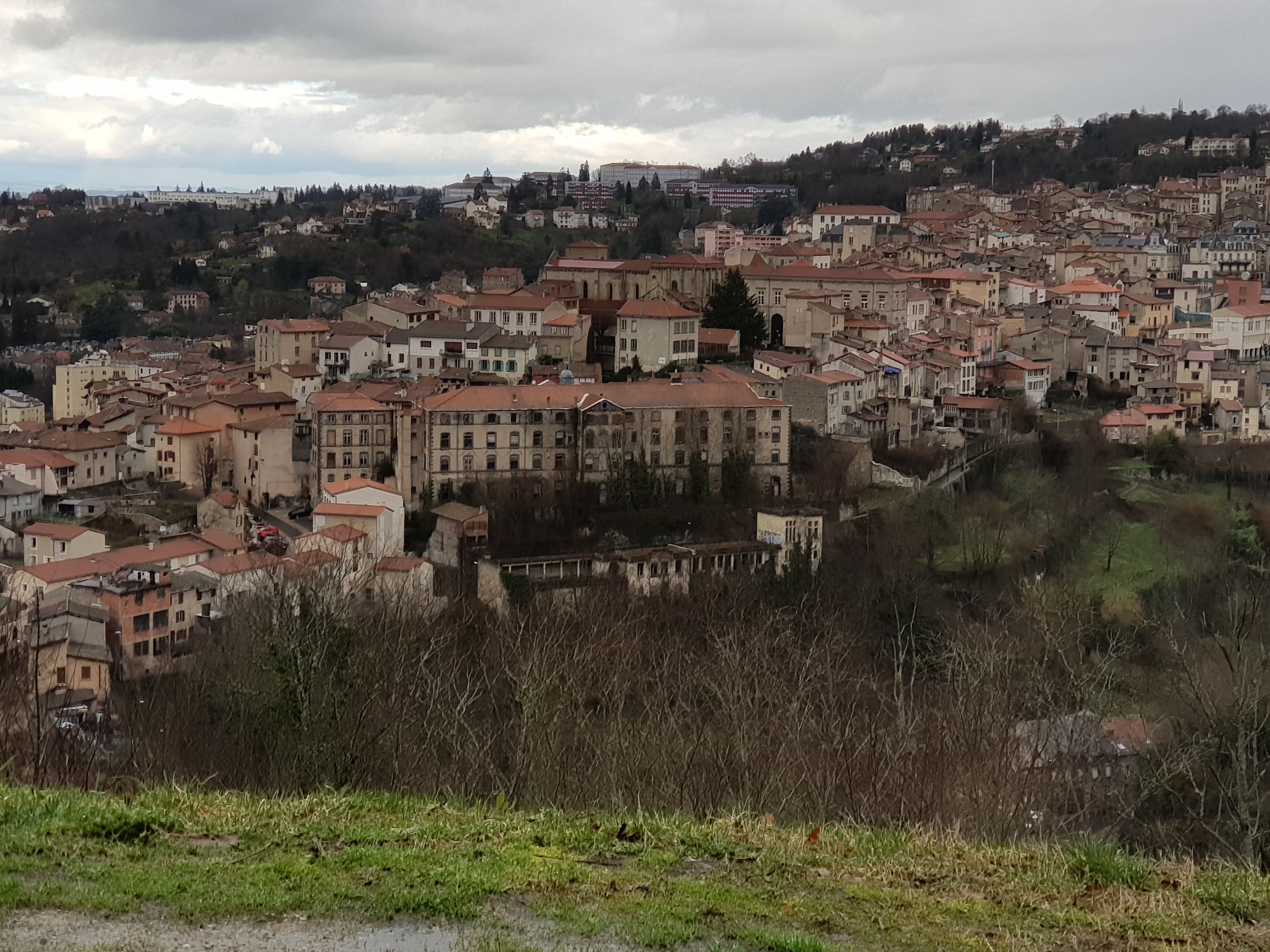
The old hospital can be seen in the center of the photograph.

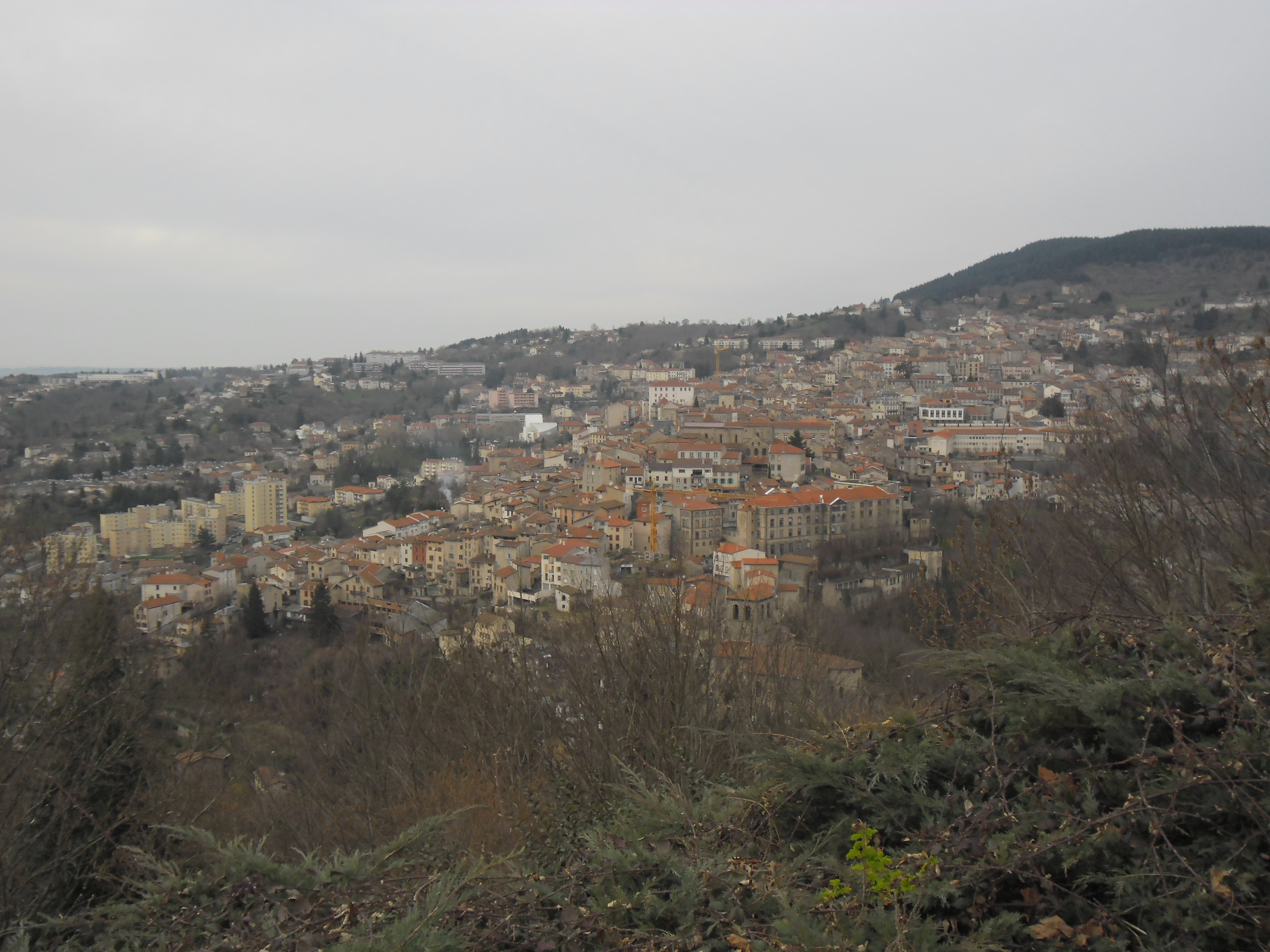
Downtown Thiers seen from the village of Les Belins. The old hospital is visible in the center right of the image.

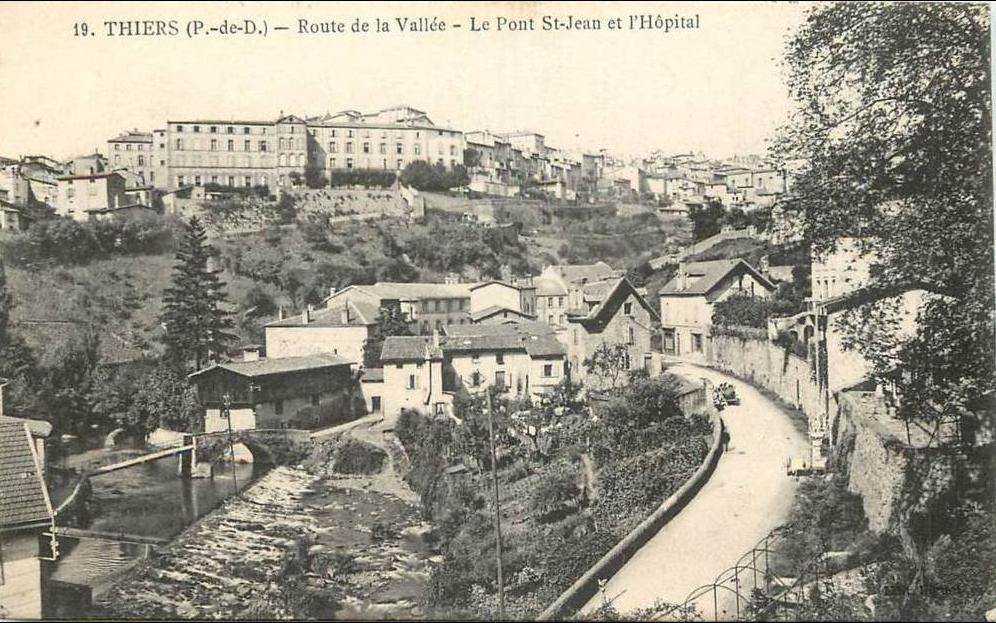
The Vallée des Usines, overlooked by the town's former hospital.

== General layout ==

General layout of Thiers old hospital
Buildings and yards	Streets
1: historical building	A: Rue Mancel-Chabot
2: hospice chapel	B: Rue du 4 septembre
3: medical-psychological center	C: Rue des murailles
4: solarium
5: former maternity ward - emergency room (destroyed)
6: former interns' building (demolished)
7: hospital gardens
8: former inner garden
9: inner courtyard
10: main courtyard

== History ==
=== Origins ===
The Thiers hospital was established in the 17th century as a result of the merger of three pre-existing establishments: the Hôtel-Dieu Vieux de la Charité, founded long ago and administered by the Thiers chapter; the Hôtel-Dieu Neuf de la Trinité, dating from the mid 16th century and administered by the municipality; and the Hôtel-Dieu Neuf de la Charité, dating from the mid 17th century. (Note: p. 161.) These charitable establishments took in the needy and provided them with rudimentary medical care. They also took in orphans and provided them with professional training. In the early 1660s, there was a desire to bring these three entities together in a single location on Rue Mancel-Chabot. The general hospital, founded by patent on January 9, 1668, opened its doors on April 15, 1669. In addition to their charitable aspects, hospitals of the time were also used to rid towns of their destitute inhabitants, which was ruthlessly done in Thiers from the very first days of the establishment's operation.

=== Expansions and demolitions ===
When the hospital first opened, only the north wing of the current building and the chapel were present. (Note: p. 157.) In 1750, the hospital was expanded with the construction of the present-day south wing, a symmetrical continuation of the north wing. In 1836, a number of alterations were recorded, notably to the chapel and the historic building - the north wing in particular. In 1937, the building was expanded again. The north wing was replaced by a new wing to the north-east of the site, housing surgery on the lower floors and maternity on the top floor. (Note: p. 112.)

=== Arrival of nurses and hospital management ===
During the first half of the 20th century, the nuns were gradually replaced by nurses and doctors. The first surgeons arrived at Thiers Hospital in 1930. The hospital consisted of large rooms with 20 to 30 beds. Beds were separated by sheets, and the familiar atmosphere was accentuated by the use of first names. The last nuns left the hospital in 1976. (Note: p. 174.)

The instruction on the regulation of hospitals and hospices, created by ministerial circular of January 31, 1840, placed them under the authority of the administrative commission. (Note: p. 158.) The nuns were delegated to carry out internal services. The first staff statutes were signed by Antonin Chastel - then mayor of Thiers - in 1937. The circular of 1840, regulating the functions of the hospital administration commission, thus legally instituted the city's entry into hospital regulations.

=== Hospital difficulties and expansion projects ===
Thiers' old hospital, located between Rue Mancel-Chabot and Rue des murailles, was particularly difficult to access for firefighters, staff and visitors. Rue Mancel-Chabot is very narrow, making it difficult for cars to get through, while Rue des Murailles is only suitable for pedestrians. The lack of parking spaces, in growing demand, was also a major problem for the hospital's accessibility. In 1967, the Clinique de Chantemerle opened its doors in the lower town. (Note: p. 182.) Its location on the plain, its size and accessibility - combined with the fact that the Thiers hospital had had a reputation for being an undignified hospice for several decades - meant that Thiers residents soon preferred to seek treatment in the lower town at the clinic, rather than going up to the old hospice in the town center. (Note: p. 183.)

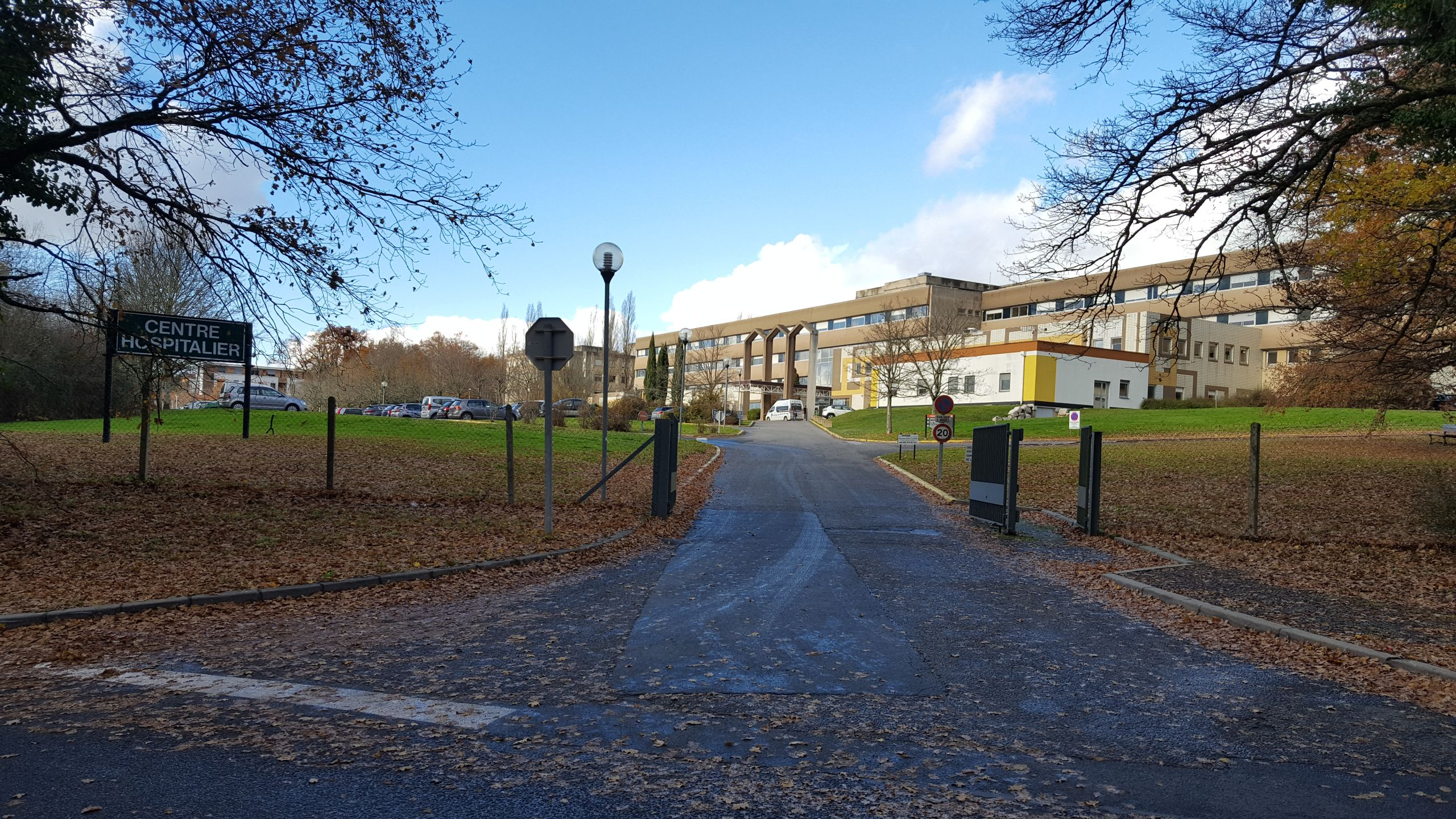
The entrance to the new Thiers hospital on the Fau site in 2018.

In the second half of the 1970s, as the last of the nuns left the facility, a number of expansion studies were carried out. Feasibility studies were carried out to extend the hospital into the gardens, but the steep terrain quickly limited this idea. Other solutions were considered, such as building annexes directly in the medieval town, but failed. In the 1960s, the hospital had created an annex at Les Belins to house the Le Belvédaire retirement home, giving rise to the idea of moving the hospital center outside the town, to the Fau site. In 1976, the psychiatric ward was opened at Le Fau. (Note: p. 185.)

==== 1977 municipal elections ====
In 1977, when Maurice Adevah-Pœuf, with the support of Dr. Gautier, dethroned René Barnérias as mayor of Thiers, the project to move the hospital was well underway. The first models were built, and after 9 years' work on various budgets and with the approval of the Board of Directors, the foundation stone of the future Thiers Hospital centre was laid in 1986. (Note: p. 186.) (Note: p. 187.)

=== Progressive closure ===
In 1988, a large part of the facility moved to newly-built buildings outside the town center, close to the village of Le Fau, still in the Thiers commune. Only part of the care remained on the town site, in an annex building: the medico-psychological consultation center. This medical center cared for children and adolescents suffering from psychological disorders. In 2016, this center in turn moved to Le Fau in the lower town, leaving the downtown site unused. The relocation of the first major part of the hospital at the end of the 20th century left the building derelict, with maintenance stopped. (Note: p. 169.)

=== Current condition ===
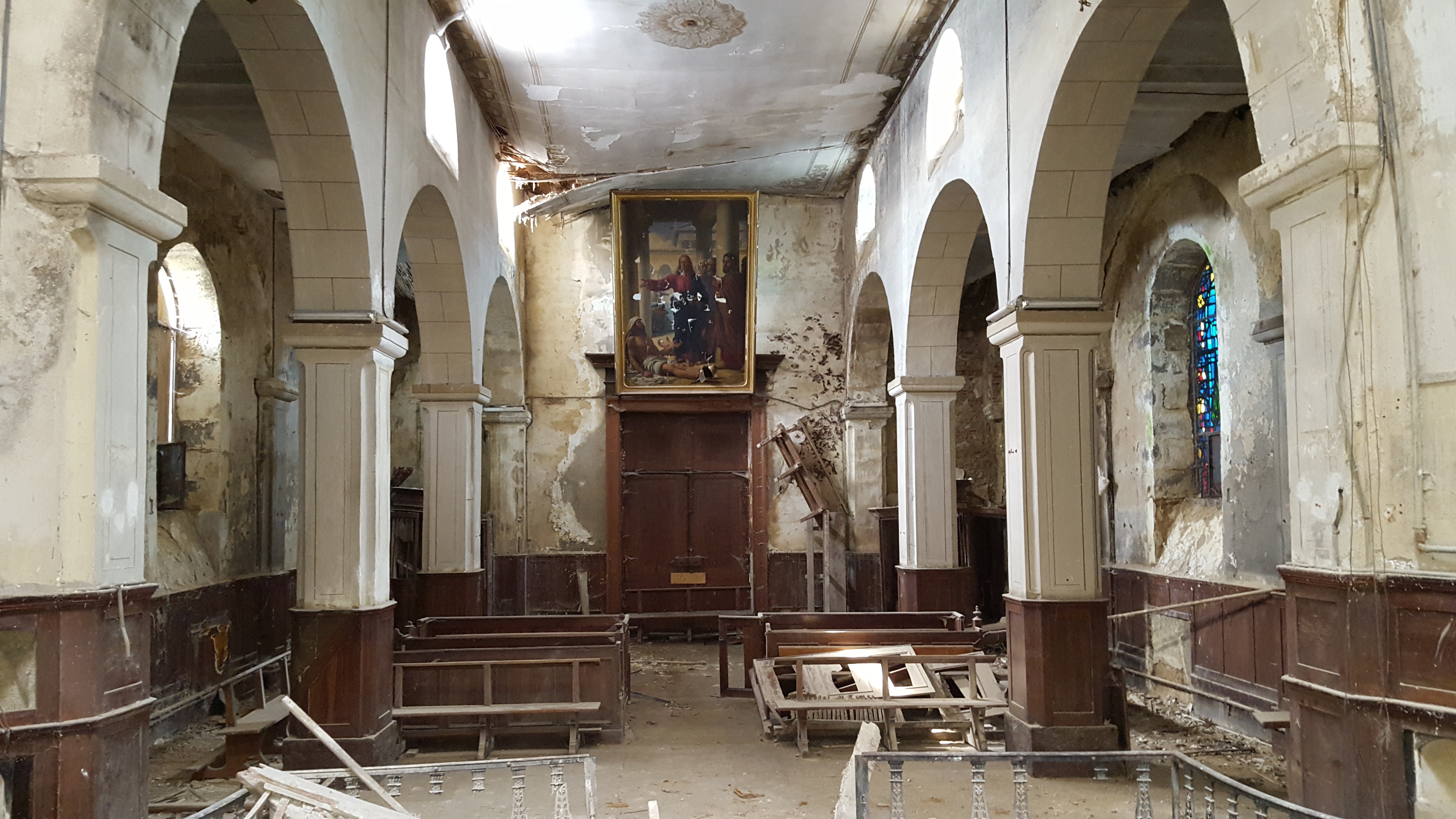
Interior of the chapel in July 2017.

Thiers' old hospital is in a generally poor state of preservation. No maintenance work has been carried out since 2007. The roof is partially damaged, allowing rainwater to run off inside the building, which encourages dampness and mold. Several floors of the upper levels - built with a wooden frame, as opposed to the first floor, which was built with a stone frame - have collapsed inside the building. Weeping merula, a wood-decay fungus, has been attacking the building for several years. The fungus - which had previously been kept outside the building - was able to penetrate the building's interior through the various openings (windows, doors and holes in the roof).

Part of the building was demolished in 2015 to free up space for a future 70-space parking lot. As of November 2018, the project had still not been implemented.

=== Protection of the building ===
The entire site of the old hospital is listed in the Plan de sauvegarde et de mise en valeur and in the Thiers Site patrimonial remarquable. These measures help to protect and enhance the town's historic heritage.

=== Rehabilitation project ===
==== Future of the facility ====
When the building closed in the 1980s, several rehabilitation projects were mooted, but none came to fruition. In 2015, part of the building - the former maternity hospital - was demolished to make way for a 70-space parking lot, with a view to rehabilitating the site as a seniors' residence.

While all rehabilitation projects were ruled out in 2020, a sale project presented by the municipality, owner of the site, was announced at the municipal council meeting. The plan was to divide the building into two parts: one reserved for private housing, developed by a private investor, and the other retained by the town of Thiers to create the new Thiers Cutlery Museum.

==== Rehabilitation of the surroundings ====
In line with the project to rehabilitate the site itself, the town of Thiers is also studying the redevelopment of the building's surroundings. Today, the existing pavements and landscaping are ageing. Sidewalks are discontinuous and often narrow, making it difficult to maintain a continuous pedestrian flow. The topography of the site makes the layout more complicated, and the roadway takes precedence over pedestrian paths. The plan is to modify the road layout - essentially Rue Mancel-Chabot - create a forecourt for the future senior residence and redevelop Rue des Murailles, located just below the building site.

== Architecture ==
=== Layout and exterior decor ===
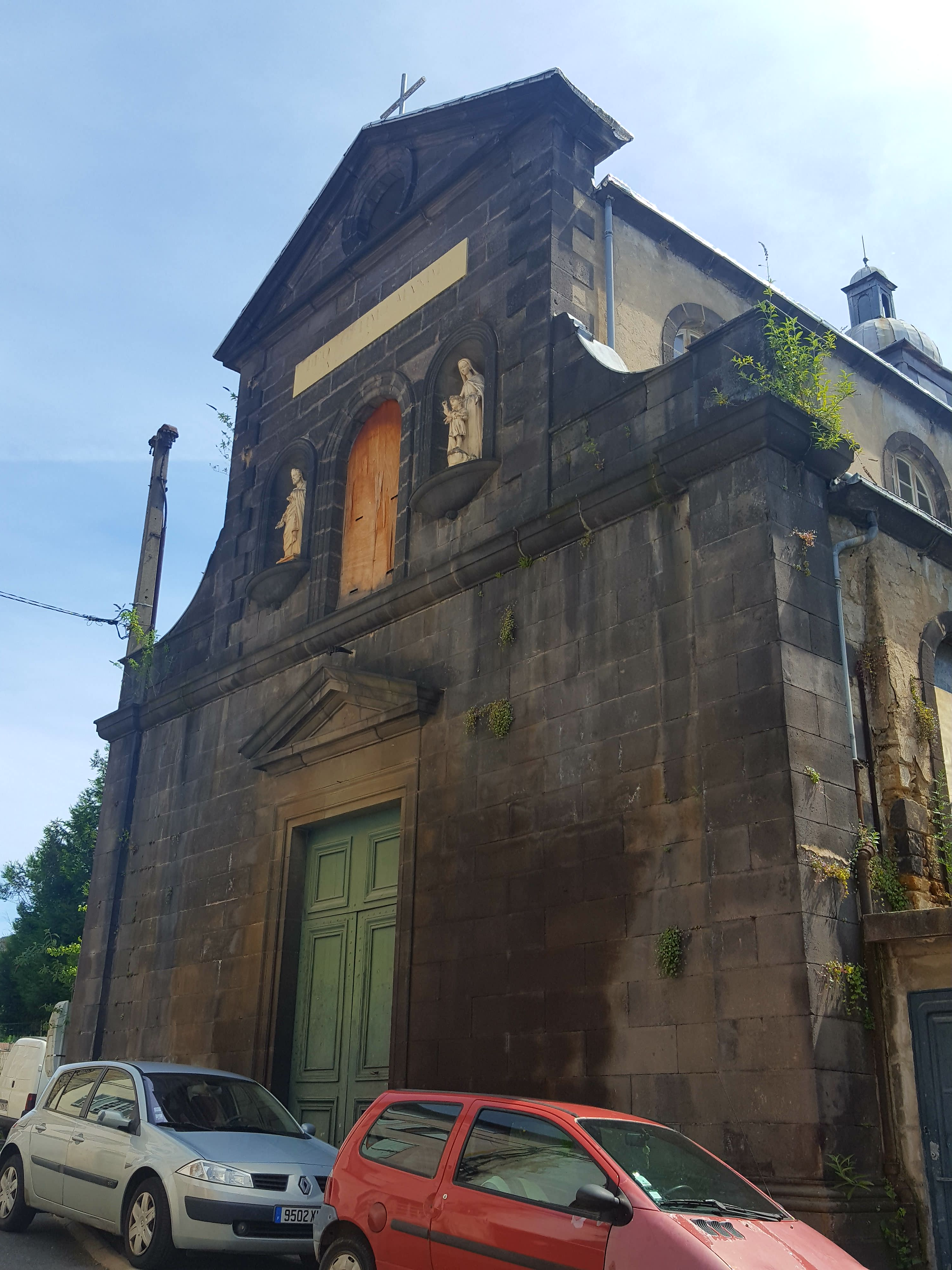
West facade of the hospice chapel.

Granite and Volvic stone were used to construct the main building. The granite, now partially hidden by rendering, is visible at the foot of the building, while the Volvic stone, particularly visible at the corners formed by the windows and walls, is highlighted by its relief and its more imposing dark color.

The chapel follows the same construction methods. The only difference is that the western façade is built entirely of Volvic stone. Several statues representing religious figures are placed high up on the chapel's façade.

In the 19th century, the roof of the hospital's central building was renovated. The ridge was raised, increasing the slope of both sides of the roof.

=== Architectural and interior design ===
The first two floors - including the first floor - are supported by large stone vaults, while the upper floors are built on wooden frames with large, sometimes carved wooden beams. Two large Volvic stone staircases serve the floors of the main building and the chapel.

The main part of the hospital features several objects listed in the Palissy database. These include holy water fonts, antique wardrobes, paintings and fireplaces. The lower levels feature large stone vaults, while the upper levels are supported by large carved wooden beams.

List of items in the Palissy database

Listed items	Protection (Note: Objects included in the lists of MH classified or listed objects.)	Date (Note: Date of protection, not date of production.)	Information sheet
statue of the Virgin and Child	registered	1982	PM63002364
toilet	registered	1982	PM63002363
wardrobe	registered	1982	PM63002362
dresser	registered	1982	PM63002361
wardrobe (2)	registered	1982	PM63002360
dresser (2)	registered	1982	PM63002359
holy water font	registered	1953	PM63002358
paintings of the Holy Family and Saint Magdalene	-	-	IM63003488
medicine jars	-	-	IM63003487
painting: Offering to Aesculapius	listed	1983	IM63003486
holy water font (2)	listed	1953	IM63003484
two-body wardrobe	registered	1982	IM63003483
wardrobe (3)	registered	1982	IM63003482
wardrobe (4)	-	-	IM63003481
2-compartment dresser	registered	1982	IM63003480
wardrobe (5)	-	-	IM63003479
table	registered	1982	IM63003478
medicine jars (2)	listed	1982	PM63001399
medicine jars (3)	listed	1983	PM63001398
medicine jars (4)	listed	1983	PM63001397
mortar	listed	1983	PM63001396
mortars and pestles	listed	1983	PM63001395
chimney plate	listed	1983	PM63001394
tableau : offrande à Esculape	listed	1983	PM63001393

== Hospital gardens ==
=== Original garden layout ===
As soon as the hospital opened, the hospital's nuns created a large garden between the city walls and the Durolle River, at the bottom of the Vallée des Usines. They were responsible for its upkeep and development, although it remained the property of the hospital. The steeply sloping garden was terraced to grow fruit and vegetables for patients and nursing staff. It was completed to the north by other gardens - maintained by private owners - which followed the same layout. Large vineyards were planted between the foot of the fourth wall and the Durolle riverbed.

=== Abandonment of the site ===
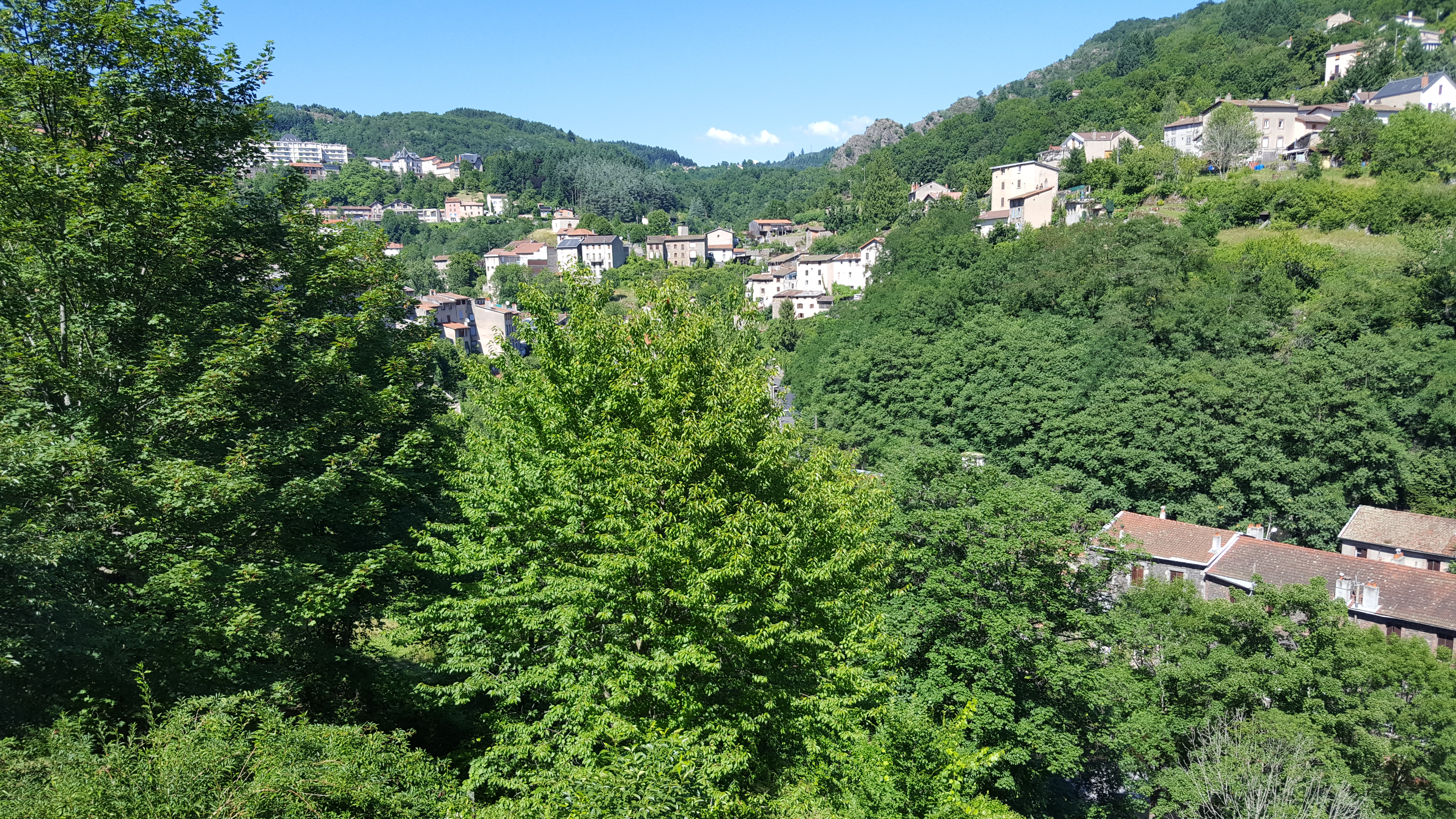
Vallée des Usines taken from the top of the old hospital garden in 2017.

When the hospital moved permanently, the gardens were only partially maintained, if at all. Trees grew untrimmed, and brambles invaded the entire garden, only to be overtaken by falling rocks due to a lack of maintenance on the few buildings in the park. The solarium, built at the very top of the garden, has been covered by weeds and brambles growing at its feet.

=== Park redevelopment ===
In 2012, after decades of neglect, the gardens were restored. The municipal services planted vines to recall one of the garden's original purposes. Every year, grape harvests are organized by the "Pichet-Bitord" brotherhood. Today, the park is part of the Vallée des Usines itinerary, of which it is a veritable geographical backbone. Michelin's Guide vert ( lists the route with two stars, accompanied by the company)s "Worth a detour".

== The old hospital in art ==
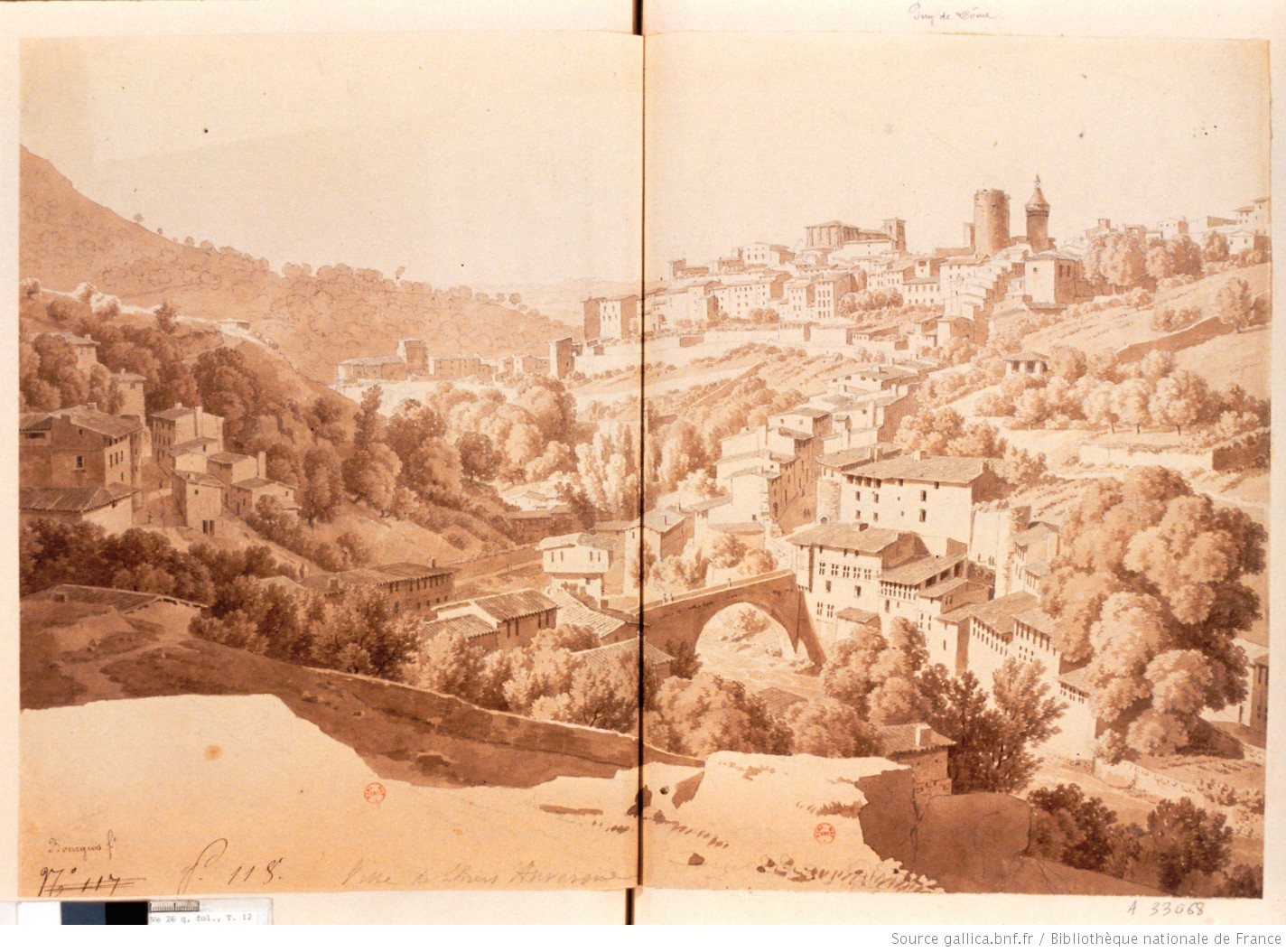
Although not very visible on this engraving, the old hospital is present near the center of the image.

The old hospital is the most visible building in the medieval town when viewed from the mountain to the east of the town. It features in paintings and engravings depicting this side of the town. In addition, a lithograph by Jean-Louis Tirpenne, based on a depiction by Auvergne painter Michel Goutay, is devoted entirely to the hospital in the book L'Ancienne Auvergne et le Velay, published in 1843-1847.

In 2007, an association called "Le Pays thiernois" published a book with the evocative subtitle Portrait croisé des hôpitaux thiernois. Written by members of staff at the time, as well as historians and town archivists such as Jacques Ytournel, the book gathers together various accounts of how the hospital functioned when it was still open, its patients and the buildings of the time, with information on its various evolutions. (Note: p. 233.)

== Bibliography ==
- Association Le Pays thiernois (2007). In corpore sano : portrait croisé des hôpitaux thiernois [In corpore sano: a cross-section of Thiers hospitals]. Thiers: Ville de Thiers.
- Hadjadj, Dany (1999). Pays de Thiers: le regard et la mémoire [Pays de Thiers: a look and a memory] (in French). Thiers: Presses Univ Blaise Pascal. ISBN 978-2-84516-116-0.
- Jacqueton, Hubert (1896). Études sur la ville de Thiers [Studies on the town of Thiers] (in French). Thiers: Picard.
- Revel, Guillaume (2011). L'armorial de Guillaume Revel : châteaux, villes et bourgs du Forez au XVe siècle [Guillaume Revel's armorial: castles, towns and villages of Forez in the 15th century] (in French). Thiers: Association de liaison pour le patrimoine et l'archéologie en Rhône-Alpes et en Auvergne. ISBN 978-2-916125-05-3.
