= List of senators of Hauts-de-Seine =

Location of Hauts-de-Seine in France

Reorganization of the former Seine-et-Oise and Seine departments in 1968. Hauts-de-Seine extends to the west of central Paris.

Following is a list of senators of Hauts-de-Seine, people who have represented the department of Hauts-de-Seine in the Senate of France. The department was created in 1968 during a reorganization of the former Seine-et-Oise and Seine departments.

Senators for Hauts-de-Seine under the French Fifth Republic:

Term	Name	Party or group	Notes
1968–1977	André Aubry	PCF	
1968–1977	Edmond Barrachin		Died in office
1968–1977	Robert Parenty	CDS	From 9 November 1975 in place of Edmond Barrachin
1968–1977	Georges Dardel	SFIO	
1968–1977	Jean Fleury	UD	
1968–1977	André Fosset		Resigned (named to cabinet)
1968–1977	Jean Fonteneau	CDS	Replaced André Fosset on 9 November 1975
1968–1977	Michel Maurice-Bokanowski	UDR	
1968–1977	Guy Schmaus	PCF	
1977–1986	André Fosset	CDS	
1977–1986	Jean-Pierre Fourcade	PR	
1977–1986	Charles Pasqua		Resigned (named to cabinet)
1977–1986	Paul Graziani	RPR	From 21 April 1986 in place of Charles Pasqua
1977–1986	Michel Maurice-Bokanowski	RPR	
1977–1986	Anicet Le Pors		Resigned (named to cabinet)
1977–1986	Monique Midy	PCF	From 24 July 1981 in place of Anicet Le Pors
1977–1986	Robert Pontillon	PS	
1977–1986	Guy Schmaus	PCF	
1986–1995	André Fosset	UDF	
1986–1995	Jean-Pierre Fourcade	UDF	
1986–1995	Jacqueline Fraysse	PCF	
1986–1995	Paul Graziani	RPR	
1986–1995	Michel Maurice-Bokanowski	RPR	
1986–1995	Robert Pontillon		Died in office
1986–1995	Françoise Seligmann	PS	From 21 March 1992 in place of Robert Pontillon
1986–1995	Émile Tricon		Resigned 10 May 1988
1986–1995	Charles Pasqua		Replaced Émile Tricon; Resigned (named to cabinet)
1986–1995	Jean-Pierre Schosteck	RPR	From 1 May 1993 in place of Charles Pasqua
1995–2004	Robert Badinter	PS	
1995–2004	Denis Badré	UDF	
1995–2004	Charles Ceccaldi-Raynaud	RPR	
1995–2004	Jean-Pierre Fourcade	UDF	
1995–2004	Jacqueline Fraysse		Resigned (elected deputy 12 June 1997)
1995–2004	Michel Duffour		Replaced Jacqueline Fraysse; Resigned (named to cabinet)
1995–2004	Roland Muzeau	PCF	From 29 March 2000 in place of Michel Duffour
1995–2004	Charles Pasqua		Resigned
1995–2004	Roger Karoutchi	RPR	From 17 December 1999 in place of Charles Pasqua
1995–2004	Jean-Pierre Schosteck	RPR	
2004–2011	Robert Badinter	PS	
2004–2011	Denis Badré	UDF	
2004–2011	Isabelle Debré	UMP	
2004–2011	Jean-Pierre Fourcade	UMP	
2004–2011	Roger Karoutchi	Groupe Les Républicains	Resigned 24 June 2007 (named to cabinet)
2004–2011	Jacques Gautier	Groupe Les Républicains	Replaced Roger Karoutchi on 25 June 2007; Resigned 23 July 2009
2004–2011	Roger Karoutchi	Groupe Les Républicains	Returned to senate 24 July 2009 to 28 July 2009
2004–2011	Jacques Gautier	Groupe Les Républicains	Replaced Roger Karoutchi on 29 July 2009
2004–2011	Roland Muzeau		Resigned (elected deputy)
2004–2011	Brigitte Gonthier-Maurin	PCF	From 29 June 2007 in place of Roland Muzeau
2004–2011	Charles Pasqua	UMP	
2011–2017	Isabelle Debré	Les Républicains	
2011–2017	André Gattolin	EELV	
2011–2017	Jacques Gautier	Groupe Les Républicains	Reigned 31 December 2016
2011–2017	Brigitte Gonthier-Maurin	PCF	
2011–2017	Philippe Kaltenbach	PS	
2011–2017	Roger Karoutchi	Les Républicains	
2011–2017	Hervé Marseille	Groupe Union Centriste	
2017–2023	André Gattolin	Groupe La République En Marche	
2017–2023	Xavier Iacovelli	Groupe socialiste et républicain	
2017–2023	Roger Karoutchi	Groupe Les Républicains	
2017–2023	Christine Lavarde	Groupe Les Républicains	
2017–2023	Hervé Marseille	Groupe Union Centriste	
2017–2023	Pierre Ouzoulias	Groupe communiste républicain citoyen et écologiste	
2017–2023	Philippe Pemezec	Groupe Les Républicains	

== Sources ==
- Liste des anciens sénateurs de la IIIème République par circonscription (in French), Sénat de France
- Liste des anciens sénateurs de la IVème République par circonscription (in French), Sénat de France
- Liste des anciens sénateurs de la Vème République par circonscription (in French), Sénat de France
- Liste par département – Hauts-de-Seine (in French), Sénat de France
