= Hauts-de-Seine's 1st constituency =

Constituency of the National Assembly of France

1st constituency of Hauts-de-Seine
- inline Constituency of the National Assembly of France

- Deputy: Elsa Faucillon; PCF
- Department: Hauts-de-Seine
- Cantons: Colombes-Nord-Est, Colombes-Nord-Ouest, Gennevilliers-Nord, Gennevilliers-Sud, Villeneuve-la-Garenne
- Registered voters: 62,486

The 1st constituency of the Hauts-de-Seine is a French legislative constituency in the Hauts-de-Seine département. It is represented in the XVIth legislature by Elsa Faucillon of the PCF.

== Description ==
Hauts-de-Seine's 1st constituency was created in 1967 at the same time as the department itself which had previously been part of the department of Seine. The seat includes the north of Colombes and the neighbouring suburb of Gennevilliers it also contains a vast the port and industrial complex on the south bank of the Seine river.

The constituency had been a stronghold of the French Communist Party for its entire existence; this changed at the 2012 election when the incumbent communist Roland Muzeau came second in the first round and withdrew rather than stand against the Socialist Party candidate. However, the constituency came back to its historical political position in 2017: the communist candidate, Elsa Faucillon, was elected against a candidate from the party of the president, Emmanuel Macron, while the incumbent was eliminated from the 1st round with only 9% of the votes.

== Historic representation ==
Election	Member	Party
1967	Waldeck L'Huillier	PCF
1968	Waldeck L'Huillier	PCF
1973	Waldeck L'Huillier	PCF
1978	Jacques Brunhes	PCF
1981	Jacques Brunhes	PCF
1986	Proportional representation – no election by constituency	
1988	Jacques Brunhes	PCF
1993	Jacques Brunhes	PCF
1997	Jacques Brunhes	PCF
2001	Dominique Frelaut	PCF
2002	Jacques Brunhes	PCF
2007	Roland Muzeau	PCF
2012	Alexis Bachelay	PS
2017	Elsa Faucillon	PCF
2022	Elsa Faucillon	PCF

== Election results ==
=== 2024 ===
Candidate	Party	Alliance	First round			Second round		
Candidate	Party	Alliance	Votes	%	+/–	Votes	%	+/–
Elsa Faucillon	PCF	NFP	26,225	64.83	+10.57			
Mariam Camara	RN		5,464	13.51	+4.77			
Frédéric Sarkis	RE	ENS	5,369	13.27	-6.90			
Diane de Longueville	LR diss.		1,752	4.33	N/A			
Nicolas Fegeant	DIV		596	1.47	N/A			
Zina Bounab	LO		368	0.91	-0.19			
Marie-Laure Decaillet	REC		346	0.86	-2.28			
Armelle Pertus	NPA		218	0.54	-0.13			
Marine Massonneau	DVC		117	0.29	N/A			
Valid votes			40,445	97.57	+0.73			
Blank votes			831	2.00	-0.76			
Null votes			177	0.43	+0.03			
Turnout			41,463	61.23	+23.01			
Abstentions			26,255	38.77	-23.01			
Registered voters			67,718					
Source: Ministry of the Interior, Le Monde
Result						PCF HOLD		

=== 2022 ===
Legislative Election 2022: Hauts-de-Seine's 1st constituency
Party	Candidate	Votes	%	±%
PCF (NUPÉS)	Elsa Faucillon	13,218	54.26	+12.58
Agir (Ensemble)	Marie-Ange Badin	4,913	20.17	-9.40
RN	Mariam Camara	2,128	8.74	+1.04
LR (UDC)	Abdelaziz Bentaj	1,147	4.71	−4.19
DVE	Anna Le Gal	931	3.82	N/A
REC	Marie-Laure Decaillet	764	3.14	N/A
Others	N/A	1,259	5.17	
Turnout		25,153	38.22	+0.42
2nd round result
PCF (NUPÉS)	Elsa Faucillon	16,934	70.17	+14.99
Agir (Ensemble)	Marie-Ange Badin	7,200	29.83	−14.99
Turnout		24,134	38.45	+6.68
PCF hold				

=== 2017 ===
Legislative Election 2017: Hauts-de-Seine's 1st constituency
Party	Candidate	Votes	%	±%
LREM	Isia Khalfi	6,986	29.57	N/A
PCF	Elsa Faucillon	3,942	16.69	−13.07
LFI	Nasser Lajili	3,195	13.53	N/A
PS	Alexis Bachelay	2,203	9.33	−23.18
LR	Nadia Frontigny	2,103	8.90	−3.38
FN	Tommy Anou	1,819	7.70	−3.77
EELV	Délia Toumi	502	2.13	−0.48
DIV	Abdelmajid Aodella	487	2.06	N/A
Others	N/A	2,385		
Turnout		23,622	37.80	−9.91
2nd round result
PCF	Elsa Faucillon	10,955	55.18	N/A
LREM	Isia Khalfi	8,897	44.82	N/A
Turnout		19,852	31.77	+5.72
PCF gain from PS		Swing		

=== 2012 ===
Legislative Election 2012: Hauts-de-Seine's 1st constituency
Party	Candidate	Votes	%	±%
PS	Alexis Bachelay	9,227	32.51	+8.54
FG	Roland Muzeau*	8,447	29.76	+3.01
UMP	Nora Djellab	3,484	12.28	−16.13
FN	Rémi Carillon	3,255	11.47	+7.44
DVD	Denis Butaye	1,141	4.02	N/A
EELV	Taoufik Halem	741	2.61	+0.32
Others	N/A	2,084		
Turnout		28,379	47.71	−3.36
2nd round result
PS	Alexis Bachelay	15,495	100.00	N/A
Turnout		15,495	26.05	−22.76
PS gain from PCF				

* Withdrew before the 2nd round

=== 2007 ===
Legislative Election 2007: Hauts-de-Seine's 1st constituency
Party	Candidate	Votes	%	±%
UMP	Véronique Vignon	8,405	28.41	
PCF	Roland Muzeau	7,914	26.75	
PS	Philippe Sarre	7,092	23.97	
MoDem	Leila Leghmara	2,046	6.92	
FN	Marie-Cécile Rabier	1,192	4.03	
LV	Jean-Marc Denjean	677	2.29	
Others	N/A	2,260		
Turnout		30,272	51.07	
2nd round result
PCF	Roland Muzeau	17,861	63.54	
UMP	Véronique Vignon	10,249	36.46	
Turnout		28,934	48.81	
PCF hold				

=== 2002 ===
Legislative Election 2002: Hauts-de-Seine's 1st constituency
Party	Candidate	Votes	%	±%
PCF	Jacques Brunhes	9,208	31.38	
UMP	Cecile Barthe	5,782	19.71	
PS	Maurice Lobry	5,268	17.96	
FN	Argentine Venchiarutti	2,837	9.67	
DL	Olivier Camps-Vaquer	2,236	7.62	
MNR	Jean-Yves Le Gallou	1,196	4.08	
LV	Richard Merra	996	3.39	
Others	N/A	1,816		
Turnout		29,846	56.08	
2nd round result
PCF	Jacques Brunhes	15,860	60.35	
UMP	Cecile Barthe	10,421	39.65	
Turnout		27,110	50.95	
PCF hold				

=== 1997 ===
Legislative Election 1997: Hauts-de-Seine's 1st constituency
Party	Candidate	Votes	%	±%
PCF	Jacques Brunhes	11,554	34.04	
FN	Jean-Yves Le Gallou	7,200	21.21	
RPR	Alain Robert	5,637	16.61	
PS	Maurice Lobry	4,921	14.50	
LV	Alain Rouat	1,379	4.06	
LO	Michel Breton	958	2.82	
Others	N/A	2,294		
Turnout		34,961	61.35	
2nd round result
PCF	Jacques Brunhes	22,396	68.54	
FN	Jean-Yves Le Gallou	10,282	31.46	
Turnout		35,622	62.51	
PCF hold				

== Sources ==
- Official results of French elections from 1998: "Résultats électoraux officiels en France" (in French). Archived from the original on 20 December 2011.
