= Badré =

Badré or Badre is a surname. Notable people with the surname include:

- Bertrand Badré (born 1968), French banker
- Denis Badré (born 1968), French politician
- Jean Badré (1913–2001), French Catholic bishop
- Leila Badre (born 1943), Lebanese archaeologist
- Paul Badré (1906-2000), French pilot and aeronautical engineer
