= André Chassaigne =

French politician (born 1950)

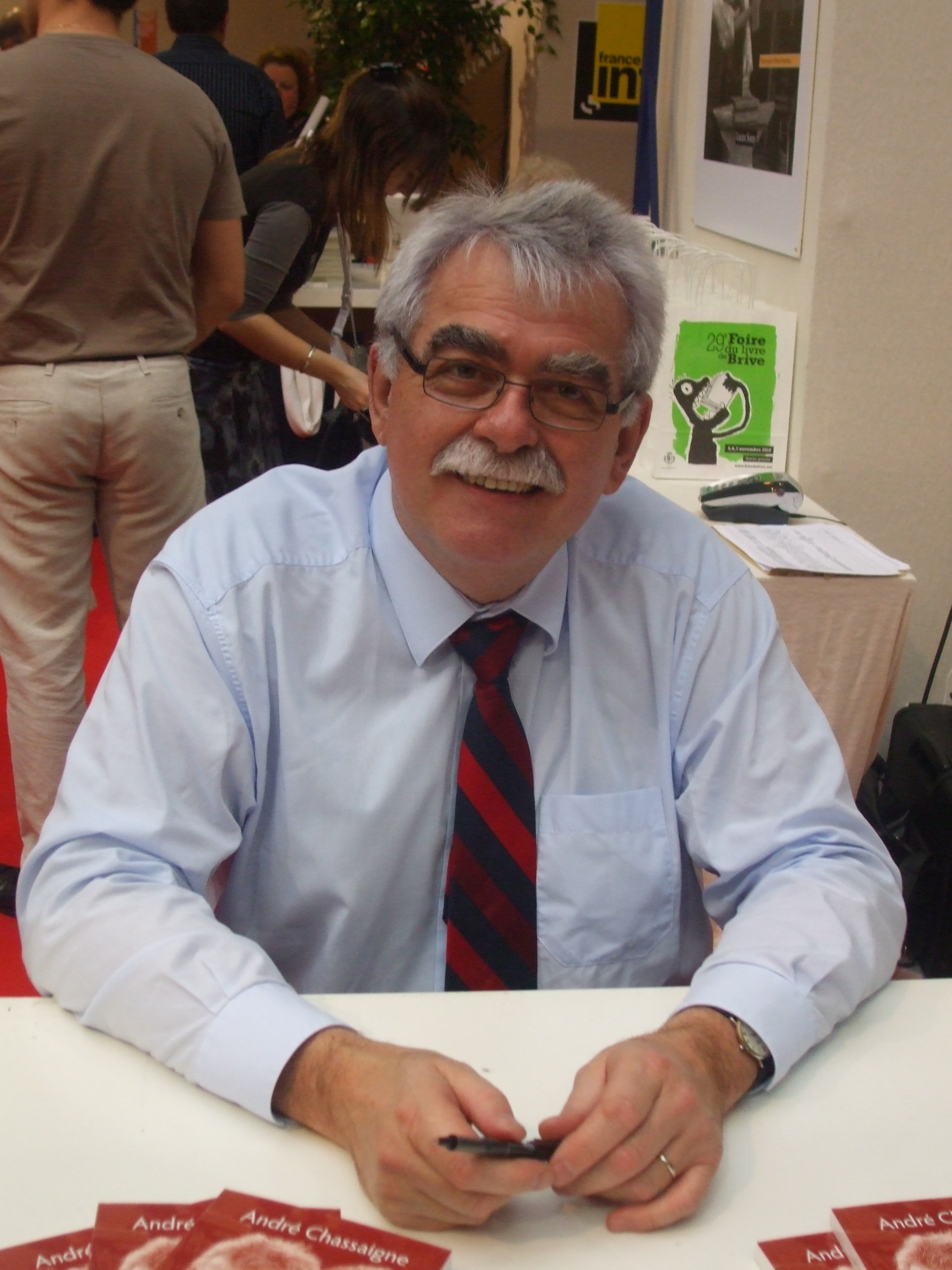
- Chassaigne in 2010

President of the Democratic and Republican Left group in the National Assembly
- In office 21 June 2012 – 31 March 2025
- Preceded by: Roland Muzeau
- Succeeded by: Stéphane Peu

Member of the National Assembly for Puy-de-Dôme's 5th constituency
- In office 19 June 2002 – 31 March 2025
- Preceded by: Maurice Adevah-Pœuf
- Succeeded by: Julien Brugerolles

Mayor of Saint-Amant-Roche-Savine
- In office 14 March 1983 – 21 April 2010
- Succeeded by: François Chassaigne

Departmental Councillor of Puy-de-Dôme
- In office 25 March 1979 – 28 March 2004
- Constituency: Canton of Saint-Amant-Roche-Savine

Deputy Mayor of Saint-Amant-Roche-Savine
- In office 20 March 1977 – 14 March 1983

Personal details
- Born: 2 July 1950 (age 76) Clermont-Ferrand, France
- Party: French Communist Party
- Education: École Normale Primaire
- Occupation: Teacher • Principal • Politician
- Website: andrechassaigne.com

André Chassaigne (French pronunciation: [ɑ̃dʁe ʃasɛɲ]; born 2 July 1950) is a French politician and member of the French Communist Party (PCF). He served as a member of the National Assembly for the 5th constituency of Puy-de-Dôme from 2002 to 2025, and presided over the Democratic and Republican Left group from 2012 to 2025. He was the New Popular Front's candidate for the presidency of the National Assembly following the 2024 legislative elections, narrowly losing to Yaël Braun-Pivet.

== Early life and career ==
André Marcel Chassaigne was born in Clermont-Ferrand to a working-class family from the Puy-de-Dôme. His father was a worker at Michelin and his mother was the daughter of a home polisher. He joined the Young Communists at the age of 17.

After studying at the École Normale Primaire in Clermont-Ferrand, Chassaigne began his career as a teacher of French literature and history-geography from 1972 to 1981. He then served as principal of the middle school in Saint-Amant-Roche-Savine, a town in the Livradois area of southeastern Puy-de-Dôme, from 1981 to 2002.

== Local and regional politics ==
Chassaigne became deputy mayor of Saint-Amant-Roche-Savine in 1977 and was elected mayor in 1983, serving until 2010 when he resigned and was succeeded by his son François. He also served as general councillor of Puy-de-Dôme for the canton of Saint-Amant-Roche-Savine from 1979 to 2004, including a term as vice-president of the departmental council from 1985 to 1992. He was a regional councillor of Auvergne from 1998 to 2000 and again from 2010 to 2015.

From 2006 to 2010, Chassaigne served as president of the National Association of Communist and Republican Elected Officials (ANECR), succeeding Bernard Birsinger who had died in office.

== National Assembly career ==
=== Election and early terms (2002–2012) ===
Chassaigne was first elected to the National Assembly in the 2002 legislative elections. While the PCF lost fourteen seats that cycle, he was the sole Communist to win a constituency not previously held by the party, taking the 5th constituency of Puy-de-Dôme (encompassing Thiers and Ambert) with 51.34% of the vote in the second round. He was regularly cited as one of the most active deputies in the National Assembly.

He was comfortably re-elected in 2007 with 65.90% of the vote in the second round, a significant improvement over his 2002 result.

==== 2012 presidential candidacy ====
In September 2010, Chassaigne announced his candidacy for the PCF nomination to represent the Left Front in the 2012 French presidential election. In the internal vote held from 16 to 18 June 2011, he received 36.82% and was defeated by Jean-Luc Mélenchon, co-president of the Left Party, who was subsequently designated as the Left Front's presidential candidate.

As head of the Left Front list in Auvergne for the 2010 French regional elections, he achieved the coalition's best result nationwide with 14.2% of the vote in the first round. For the second round, his list merged with those of René Souchon (PS–PRG–MRC) and Christian Bouchardy (Europe Écologie).

=== Group presidency and later terms (2012–2025) ===
In June 2012, he was elected president of the Democratic and Republican Left group (GDR) in the National Assembly, which brought together Left Front deputies and overseas deputies. That same year, he was re-elected as a deputy with 41.2% in the first round and 67.5% in the second round.

Chassaigne was ranked as the most active deputy of the 14th legislature by the magazine Capital in 2017, based on data collected by the Regards citoyens project, for his attendance and involvement in parliamentary work.

==== 2017 presidential debate and re-election ====
Ahead of the 2017 French presidential election, Chassaigne opposed the PCF's support for Mélenchon's candidacy during the party's internal consultation in 2016, advocating for an autonomous Communist candidacy and declaring himself available to carry it. He was the only Communist to openly declare his candidacy against the La France Insoumise candidate. However, party members voted 53.50% in favour of supporting Mélenchon.

In the 2017 legislative elections, Chassaigne won 34.85% in the first round and 63.55% in the second round against the LREM candidate Sébastien Gardette.

At the 38th Congress of the French Communist Party in Ivry-sur-Seine in 2018, Chassaigne was one of the principal advocates of an alternative orientation text, the "Manifesto for a Communist Party of the 21st Century", which sought to reaffirm the PCF's identity while distancing it from La France Insoumise. This text succeeded in putting the leadership of Pierre Laurent in a minority with 42.14% of the membership vote—an unprecedented situation for the party. A subsequent vote of militants placed the orientation text presented by Chassaigne and Fabien Roussel in first place ahead of the party congress in November.

==== 2022 and 2024 elections ====
Standing under the banner of the New Ecological and Social People's Union (NUPES) in the 2022 legislative elections, Chassaigne was re-elected in the second round with 69.43% of the vote.

In the snap 2024 legislative elections, he ran as a candidate of the New Popular Front. He qualified for the second round in first place with 37.77% of the vote, narrowly ahead of the National Rally candidate Brigitte Carletto (37.07%), and was re-elected with 55.3% of the vote.

==== Candidacy for National Assembly presidency ====
On 17 July 2024, Chassaigne was chosen by the New Popular Front as the unified left's candidate for the presidency of the National Assembly. He led the first round with 200 votes, ahead of Sébastien Chenu (National Rally) with 142 and Yaël Braun-Pivet (EPR) with 124. However, Braun-Pivet overtook him in the third round, winning 220 votes to Chassaigne's 207. The result was controversial as several caretaker ministers participated in the vote, which critics argued was improper.

==== Departure from the National Assembly (2025) ====
On 29 January 2025, Chassaigne announced his departure from the National Assembly, stating that he would take up a position solely as deputy mayor of Saint-Amant-Roche-Savine, where he had previously served as mayor from 1983 to 2010. He was elected deputy mayor on 14 March 2025. His seat was taken by his substitute, Julien Brugerolles, who had served as his parliamentary attaché since 2008. On 31 March, Stéphane Peu succeeded him as president of the GDR group.

Chassaigne spent his entire parliamentary career in the opposition. On leaving office, he reflected: "I am reaching 75 and I live in a world that is the opposite of what I would have wanted to build."

== Political positions ==
=== Agriculture ===
Chassaigne has been described as one of the embodiments of "rural communism", regularly raising the concerns of small municipalities and agriculture in the National Assembly. In April 2008, he introduced an amendment (known as "amendment 252") to a bill on genetically modified organisms that would restrict GMO cultivation in numerous zones, including regions with AOC designations. The amendment was adopted unexpectedly, provoking a crisis within the Fillon government and its parliamentary majority.

He was the author of a bill guaranteeing farmers a minimum pension of at least 85% of the minimum wage, funded by a 0.1% increase in the financial transaction tax. Although the National Assembly adopted the measure in February 2017, the subsequent government blocked it with an amendment in May 2018. He ultimately secured a unanimous vote in favour of the revaluation, and his proposal to revalue pensions for agricultural workers' spouses—particularly women—was also adopted in December 2021.

=== Environment ===
Chassaigne has frequently intervened on environmental issues, earning a reputation as the PCF's point person on ecology according to Mediapart. He has contributed to shifting the party's thinking, particularly on the question of productivism, and published a book critiquing "green capitalism" (Pour une terre commune, Arcane 17). He is perceived as a locally rooted politician, close to his constituents and the rural world.

=== Labour and pensions ===
On 15 October 2013, Chassaigne voted against the pension reform presented by the Second Ayrault government, denouncing it as an "anti-social project, unworthy of a left-wing government".

In May 2016, during a session of questions to the government, he denounced the use of Article 49.3 to pass the Labour Law, calling the procedure a "triple coup de force" against "the working world", against "our compatriots", and against "the national representation deprived of its role as legislator".

=== International affairs ===
During the 2005 referendum campaign on the Treaty establishing a Constitution for Europe, Chassaigne campaigned for the "No" vote and held a joint meeting in Clermont-Ferrand with Jean-Luc Mélenchon (PS) and Olivier Besancenot (LCR).

In June 2015, he was one of only two deputies (alongside Les Républicains member Nicolas Dhuicq) to vote against ratification of the European Union Association Agreement with Georgia and the European Union Association Agreement with Ukraine, arguing that the agreements risked aggravating Russia–Ukraine relations and could produce a "Greek-style scenario" economically.

On international questions, he has been particularly engaged in defending Cuba against the American embargo.

== Honours ==
- Knight of the Legion of Honour (2001)
- Knight of the Ordre national du Mérite
- Officer of the Ordre des Palmes académiques
- Officer of the Ordre du Mérite agricole
- Médaille du tourisme

== Publications ==
- Pour une terre commune, Arcane 17, September 2010 ISBN 978-2918721055
- Et maintenant, Monsieur le Président ? – 10 interpellations à Emmanuel Macron, Éditions de l'Atelier, August 2017 ISBN 978-2708245570
- Cuba, une étoile dans la nuit. La lutte du peuple cubain contre un blocus criminel, Le Temps des Cerises, 2023 ISBN 978-2-37071-276-9
