= Jacques Brunhes =

French politician (1934–2020)

Member of the National Assembly for Hauts-de-Seine's 1st constituency
- In office 19 June 2002 – 19 June 2007
- Preceded by: Dominique Frélaut
- Succeeded by: Roland Muzeau
- In office 13 June 1988 – 23 November 2001
- Preceded by: multi-member district elected by proportional representation
- Succeeded by: Dominique Frélaut
- In office 3 April 1978 – 1 April 1986
- Preceded by: Waldeck L'Huillier
- Succeeded by: constituency abolished for proportional representation

Regional Councillor of Île-de-France
- In office 1978–1985

General Councillor of Hauts-de-Seine
- In office 18 March 1985 – 27 June 1988

Mayor of Gennevilliers
- In office 22 September 1987 – October 2001
- Preceded by: Lucien Lanternier
- Succeeded by: Jacques Bourgoin

Minister of Tourism
- In office 23 October 2001 – 6 May 2002
- President: Jacques Chirac
- Prime Minister: Lionel Jospin
- Preceded by: Michelle Demessine
- Succeeded by: Gilles de Robien

Personal details
- Born: 7 October 1934 Paris, France
- Died: 30 September 2020 (aged 85) Paris, France
- Party: PCF
- Occupation: Teacher

Jacques Brunhes (7 October 1934 – 30 September 2020) was a French politician. A member of the French Communist Party, he served Hauts-de-Seine in the National Assembly from 1978 to 1986. Brunhes returned to the National Assembly in 1988, and served until 2001, when he was appointed Minister of Tourism. His tenure as government minister ended in 2002, and he was reelected a deputy until 2007.

== Early life and education ==
Brunhes was born in Paris, and was the son of a taxi driver. After studying at the École normale d'instituteurs d’Auteuil, he obtained a teaching license in the 18th arrondissement of Paris.

== Career ==
In 1962, he became a professor of history and geography in Villeneuve-la-Garenne.

Brunhes was elected to the National Assembly in 1978, representing Hauts-de-Seine's 1st constituency. During his terms, he served as Secretary of the Assembly, Vice-President, and quaestor. Additionally, he chaired the friendship groups between France, Vietnam, and Cambodia. From 2002 to 2007, he was a member of the Study Group on the Question of Tibet.

In addition to his time in the National Assembly, Brunhes served as Mayor of Gennevilliers and a General Councillor for Hauts-de-Seine. He was also appointed by Jacques Chirac to serve as Minister of Tourism from 2001 to 2002.

== Personal life ==
Jacques Brunhes died on 30 September 2020 at the age of 85.

== Awards and honours ==
- Knight of the Legion of Honour (2008)
