= Forges Mondière =

Former factory in Thiers, Puy-de-Dôme, France

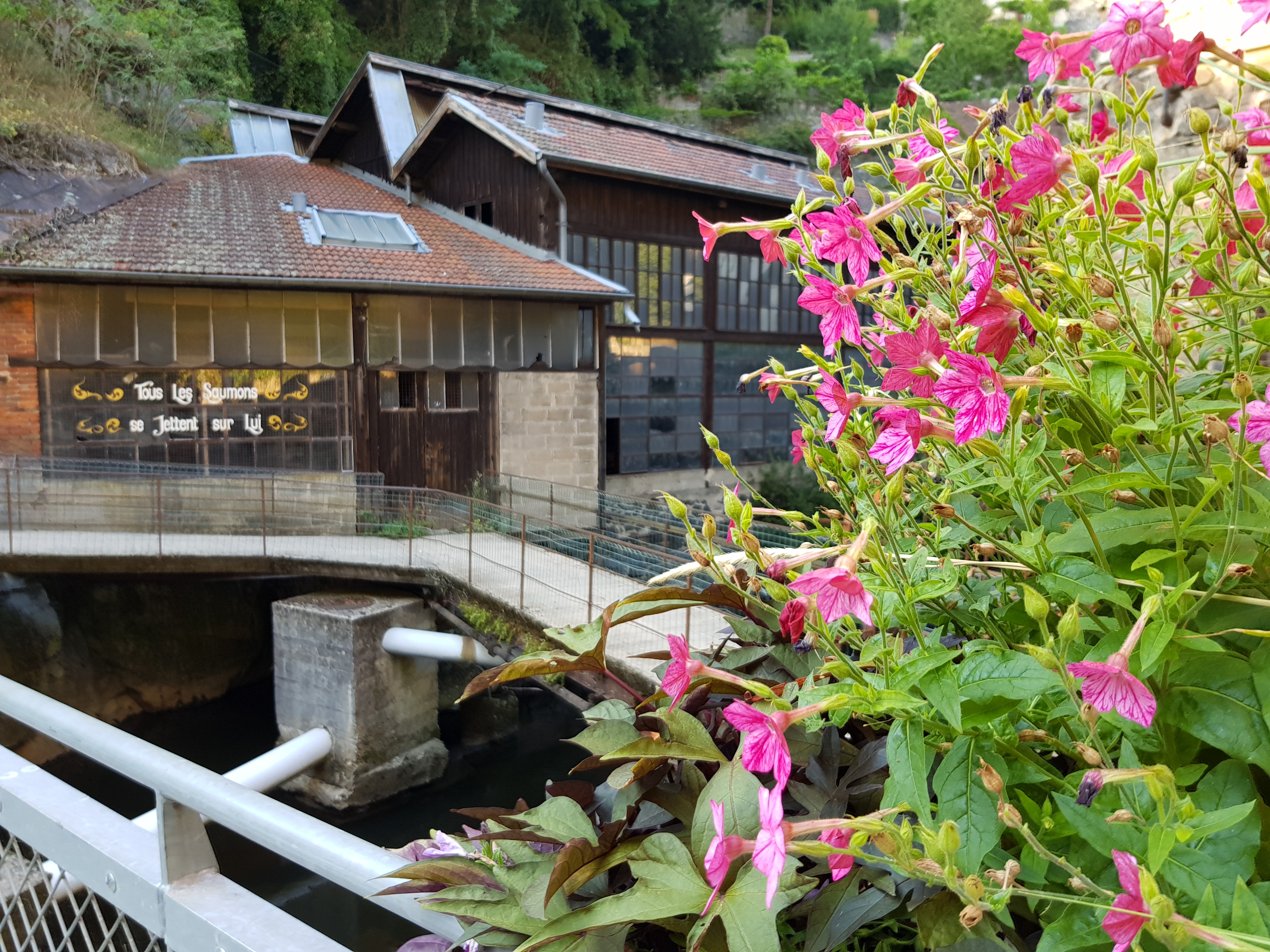
- Mondière Forges main facade, taken in 2018.
- Operated: 15th century
- Location: Thiers, Puy-de-Dôme, France
- Coordinates: 45°51′02″N 3°32′59″E
- Products: Knives, blades
- Area: 700 m^{2} (7,500 sq ft)

The Forges Mondière is a former factory specializing in the drop forging of knife blades, located in the Vallée des Usines in Thiers, in the French department of Puy-de-Dôme, within the Auvergne-Rhône-Alpes region.

The site under consideration was initially a mill in the 15th century, later transitioning into a paper mill and sawmill, and eventually becoming home to a cutlery company that also operated at the nearby May factory and in additional workshops. However, the factory closed abruptly in 1984, leaving its interior workshops frozen in time, due to fierce competition from Asian markets and the progressive relocation of valley industries to more accessible plains near highway exits. This abrupt closure occurred in close temporal proximity to the shutdown of the nearby Creux de l'Enfer factory, and it occurred just a few years after the site's purchase by the Thiers town council. The town council had initially planned to rehabilitate the site as an extension of the Museum of Cutlery. However, this project was ultimately abandoned in favor of focusing on the May factory and the Vallée des Rouets.

The factory is located in the Vallée des Usines, where the Durolle River's gorges are at their narrowest. This location has been the subject of several redevelopment projects, and some neighboring sites have already been repurposed. These include the Creux de l'Enfer, which has been converted into a contemporary art center, and the May factory, used for temporary exhibitions and conferences. The Forges Mondière was designated a historical monument in 2002, a designation shared with the May factory.

== Location ==
The building is located in the French department of Puy-de-Dôme, part of the Auvergne-Rhône-Alpes region, within the commune of Thiers. Situated in the Vallée des Usines, the building is constructed within the minor bed of the Durolle River. Moreover, the factory is adjacent to a former annex of the Delaire Forges upstream and the May factory downstream.

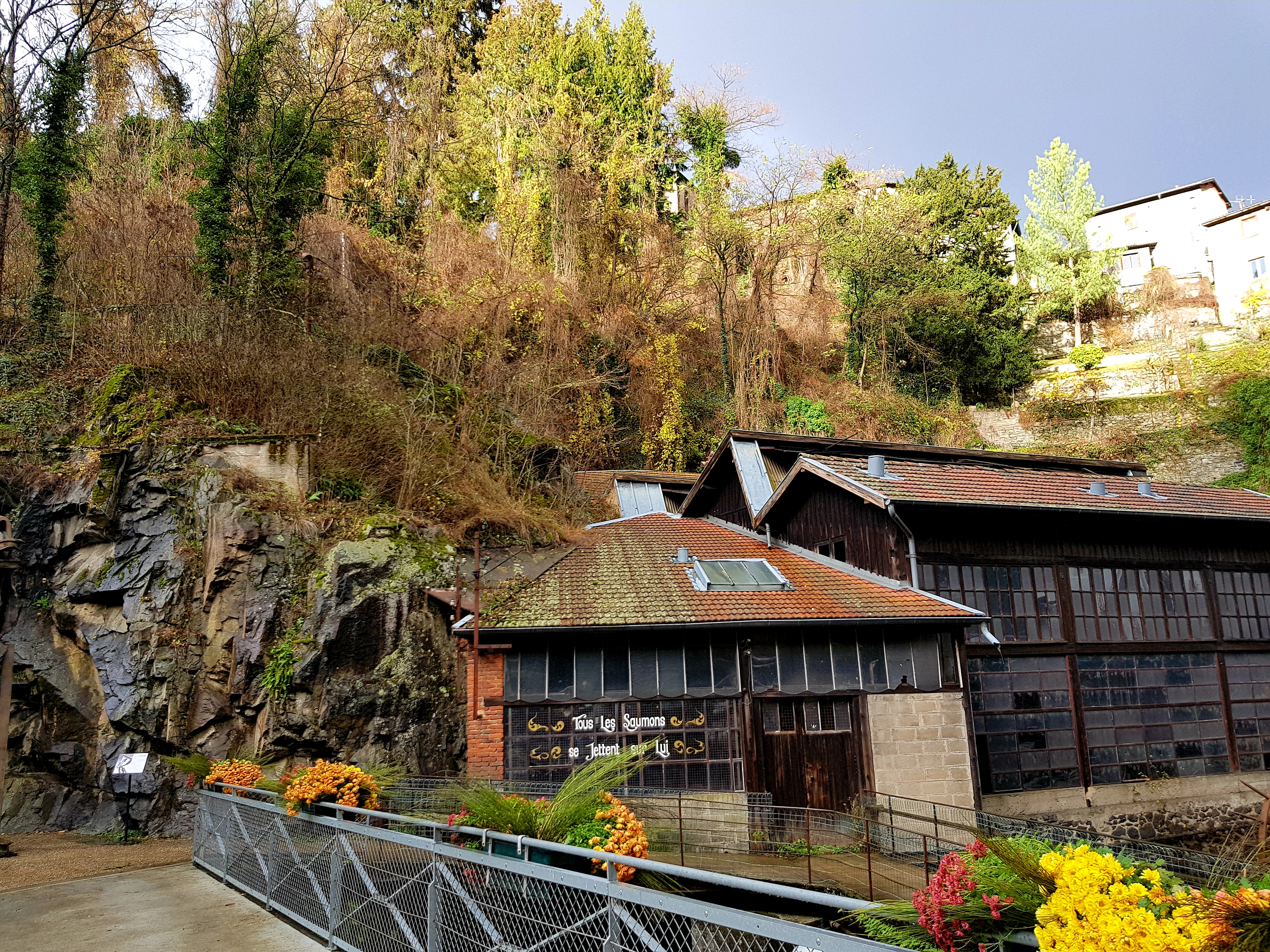
Main factory entrance, taken from the May factory footbridge.

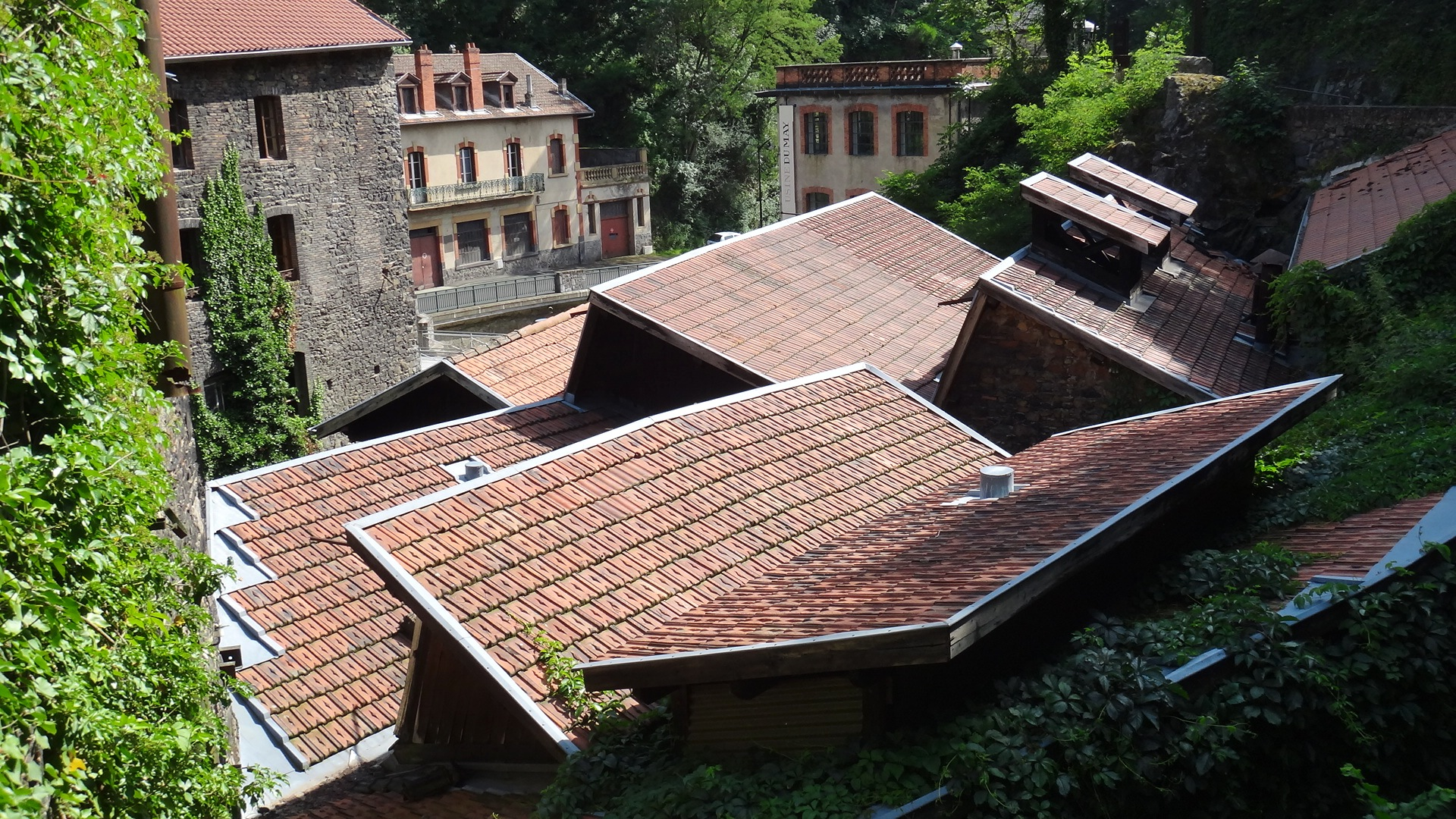
The factory roof seen from a footpath. The May factory is in the background on the right.

== General overview ==
General plan of the “heart” of the Vallée des Usines

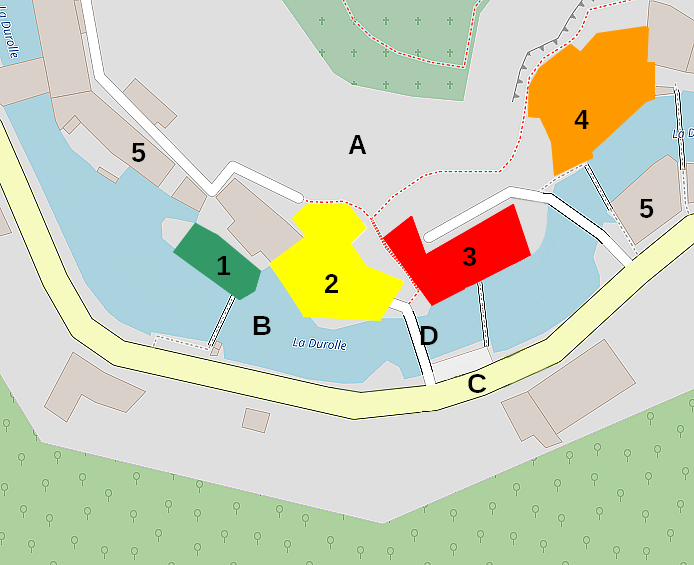

Former workshops/plants
Other
1: Entraygues factory
A: Gardens below Saint-Jean
2. Creux de l'Enfer
B: Durolle
3. May factory
C: Avenue Joseph-Claussat
4: Mondière forges
D: Access footbridge to Creux de l'enfer
5: Former cutlery workshops

== History ==
=== Origins of cutlery in the valley ===
Since the Middle Ages, the hydraulic power of the Durolle River has been harnessed in Thiers to operate a variety of industrial mills, including flour mills, tanners' fulling mills, papermakers' hammers, and, subsequently, cutlery, forge, and grinding wheel manufacturing facilities. By the 15th century, cutlery production accounted for one-quarter of Thiers' employment. During the 17th century, the valley's products were exported to various countries, including Spain, Italy, Germany, Turkey, and India, reflecting the global reach of the cutlery industry. (Note: Legrand d'Aussy remarked in his 1788 book Voyage en Auvergne that Thiers industrialists were effectively competing against their English counterparts, even in India.)

=== Origins of the factory ===
==== First grinding mill ====
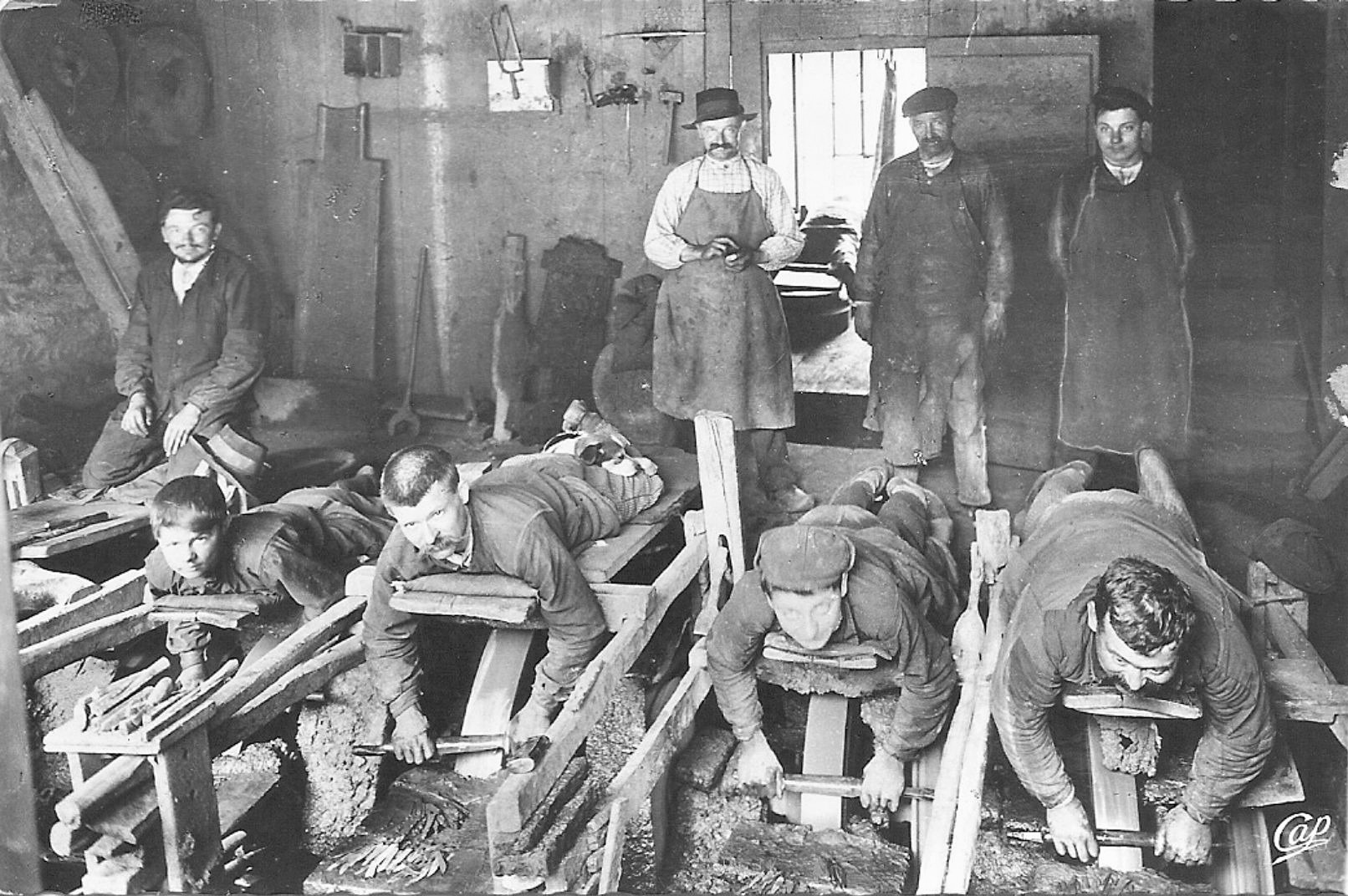
Grinders in Thiers in the early 20th century.

According to Gregory of Tours, Saint Genesius, a martyr, was decapitated on a rock in the Durolle Valley, which was subsequently referred to as the "Rock of Hell." A grinding mill was documented as being established at the foot of this rock as early as 1476. This mill, which would later become the May factory, was soon followed by another mill constructed on the current site of the Forges Mondière.

==== Paper mill ====
The factory underwent a transformation into a paper mill at the conclusion of the 16th century, achieving its zenith during the 18th century. A comprehensive overview of the paper industry during this period is provided by the industrial statistics compiled by the Thiers town council in the 19th century. The commune's industrial infrastructure comprised approximately 20 establishments, collectively employing around 800 workers. The Forges Mondière's primary product was writing paper, predominantly utilized by government ministry offices.

The narrowness of the Durolle gorges led to the relatively small size of the factory, which often collaborated with other paper mills in the valley to fulfill large orders. This cooperation established Thiers' papermakers as key suppliers to the state, which required certain papers to be made by hand using traditional methods. While this demand initially ensured the papermakers' prosperity, it later hindered their modernization efforts. The limited scale of the factories and the constrained waterwheel capacity further compounded the challenges, impeding the adoption of more sophisticated machinery. Consequently, Thiers experienced a decline in competitiveness, ultimately leading to the permanent closure of the paper mill at the Forges Mondière site in the mid-19th century.

==== Sawmill and cutlery production ====
Following the closure of the paper mill in the 1880s, the premises underwent a transition in function, becoming a site for cutlery production, a practice that was soon accompanied by the establishment of a sawmill. The timber-framed walls of this period still stand as a testament to this era. By 1901, the factory had undergone a comprehensive conversion, becoming a specialized forge focused on knife production. The factory's technical proficiency was evident in its adeptness at forging blades through stamping, a process that was meticulously executed in three stages. Initially, steel bars were sectioned through the use of mechanical stamping presses. Then, the blanks were subjected to a hot-pressing procedure between two dies mounted on a power hammer. Ultimately, the blades were stamped with a distinctive mark using a press. Each stage of this process demanded high precision, both from the tools installed on the machines and the workers operating them.

The Forges Mondière gained recognition for the quality of its products, and its reputation rapidly expanded beyond the Auvergne region, attracting prestigious clients such as Christofle, Colliot, and Caput.

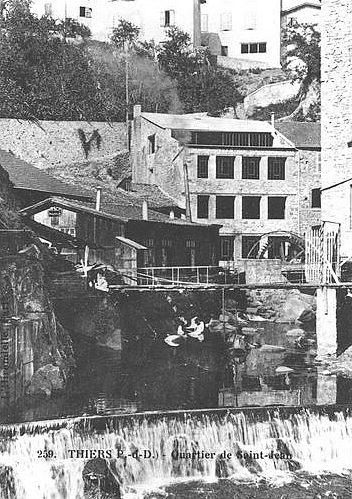
The Mondière forges factory at the end of the 19th century.

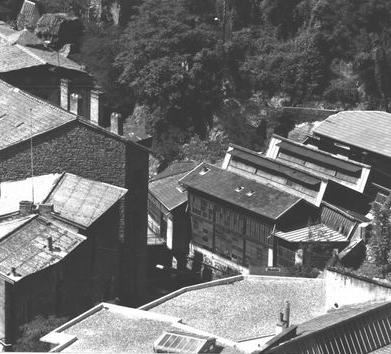
The factory in the early 20th century.

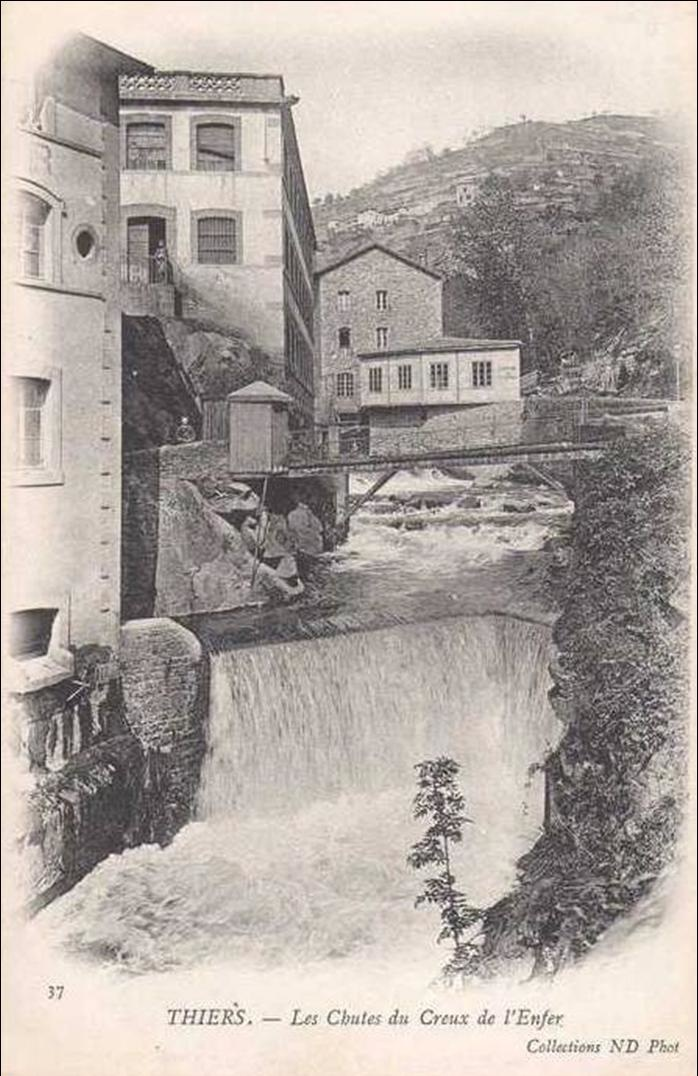
The Creux de l'enfer waterfall and part of the Mondière forges annexes in the background at the very beginning of the ^{20th} century.

=== Factory name ===
The factory's nomenclature derives from the surname of one of its former proprietors who concurrently served as its director. In 1914, this individual constructed an annex adjacent to the factory, incorporating administrative offices and his official residence.

=== Permanent closure ===
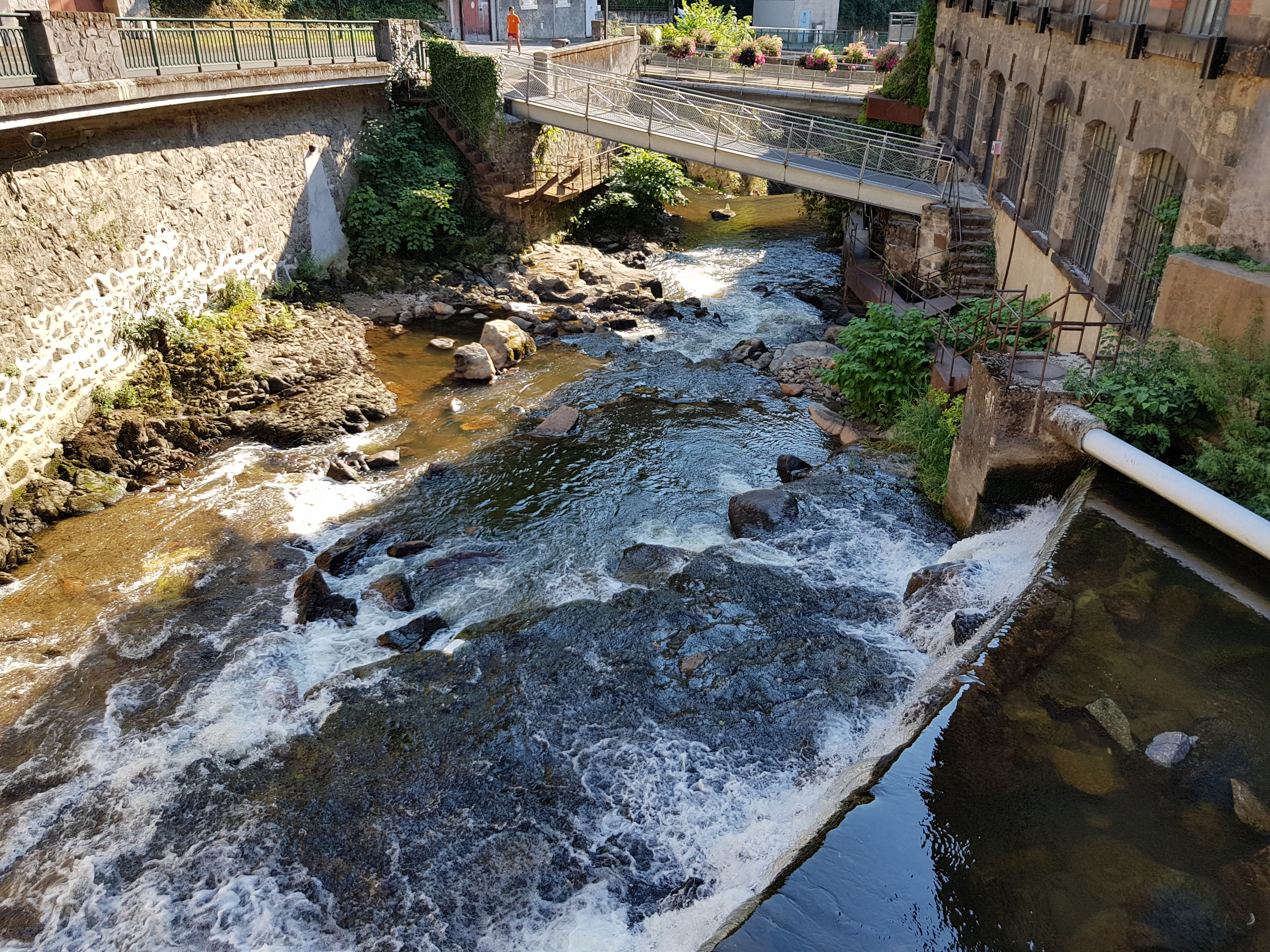
The Durolle, photographed in summer when its flow is low, in front of the May factory.

==== Issues with the Durolle river flow ====
The Forges Mondière factory ceased operations at the end of the 20th century, in 1984, whereas the Creux de l'Enfer factory permanently closed in 1956. This latter factory's closure was due to increasing problems with the Durolle River's water flow in the early 20th century. First, the river's flow during the summer remained very low and highly irregular, causing frequent work stoppages. Factories that relied on the river's hydraulic power could not operate without a sufficient water supply. Conversely, in winter, the situation reversed—the Durolle became a torrent, with immense force. The city of Thiers was one of the most flood-prone areas in the Puy-de-Dôme department, and the Vallée des Usines was the hardest-hit neighborhood during these events.

==== Transition to electricity ====
In order to address the aforementioned challenges, manufacturing facilities initiated the adoption of electricity as a primary source of power as early as 1903. By 1920, the Durolle facility had attained an average daily generation capacity of 1,000 horsepower, compared to 1,500 horsepower generated by electric power sources. The May factory transformed to accommodate electrification, thereby achieving independence from the river and attaining the status of a "complete factory."

==== Abrupt closure ====
Beginning in the second half of the 20th century, the factory and its workshops underwent further modernization, and the Durolle River was no longer used as an energy source, having been replaced by electricity. On the day before the factory's closure, employees were notified. The next day, they had just enough time to collect their belongings before leaving the factory for the last time. Following the cessation of operations, the building, which occupied a space of just over 700 m² at the time, became obsolete.

=== National symposium on monumental metal sculpture ===
In 1985, the city of Thiers hosted a National Symposium on Monumental Metal Sculpture. This event convened numerous regional and international artists who collaborated with local artisans to create their works. Canadian artist George Trakas examined the history of the Vallée des Usines through his art and installed the "sword bridge" along with a series of walkways that still overlook the waterfall and the Durolle torrent.

=== Current state ===
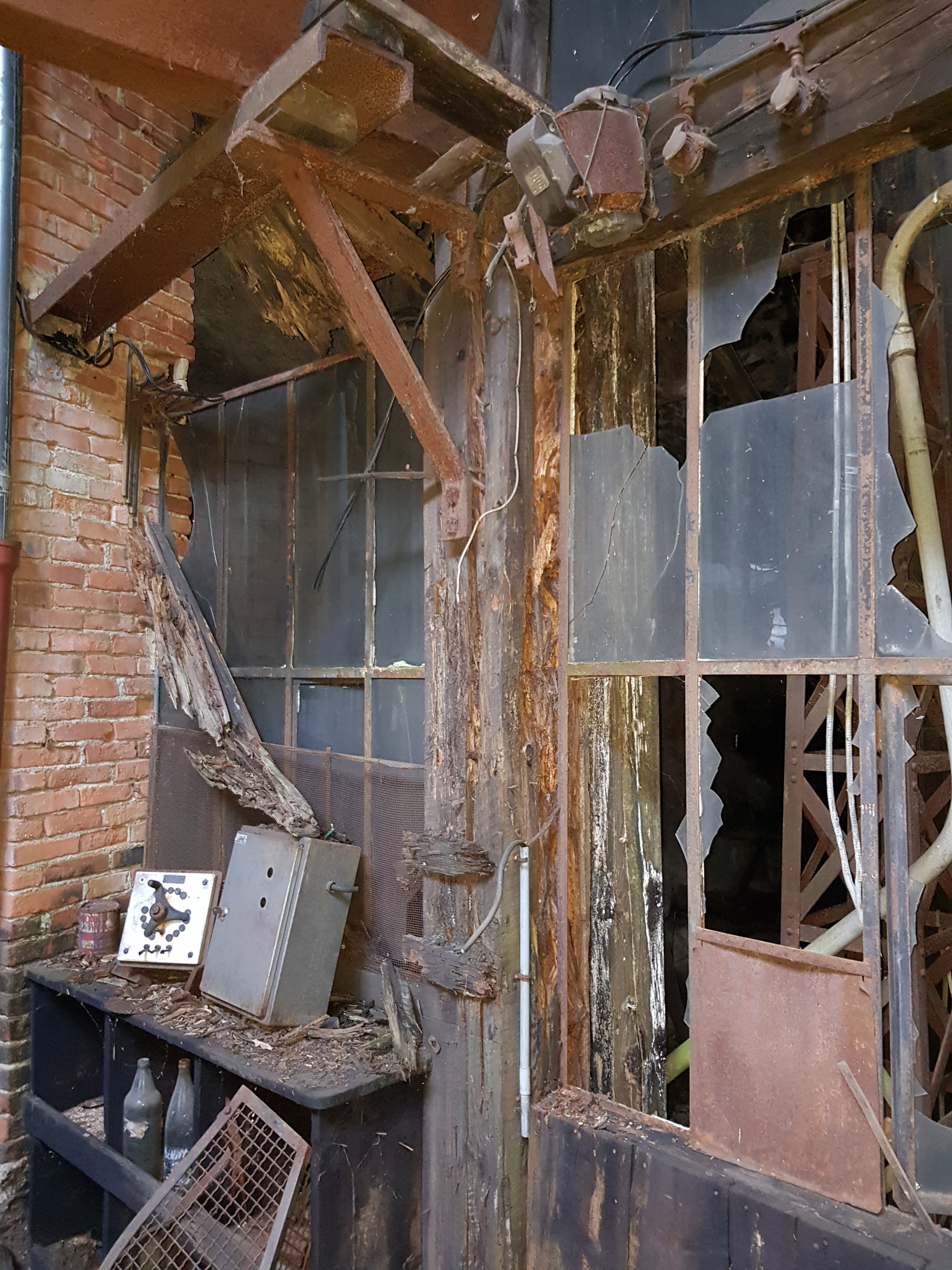
Heavily deteriorated wooden pillar inside the building.

In the aftermath of the factory's closure in 1984, the Thiers city council procured the site to perpetuate the narrative of the Vallée des Usines. Under the leadership of Maurice Adevah-Pœuf, the municipality recognized the Vallée des Usines as possessing substantial cultural and tourism potential. Despite the proposal of numerous rehabilitation and enhancement initiatives, none were executed. Concurrently, two other factories situated further downstream on the Durolle—the Creux de l'Enfer factory and the May factory—underwent restoration, with the former being converted into a contemporary art center in 1988 and the latter becoming a cultural space for hosting exhibitions. However, the Forges Mondière remained inaccessible to the public.

In 2002, the factory was designated as a historic monument. The entire site, inclusive of the interior features such as manufacturing machines and hydraulic turbines, was officially registered by decree on June 14 of that year.

By the conclusion of the year 2018, a portion of the roof of the factory annex, which contained the offices and the director's residence, had collapsed. Following several months of efforts to render the structure watertight, the city arrived at the decision to undertake a complete demolition of the roof, in anticipation of its replacement. The total financial expenditure incurred for these endeavors amounted to €30,000.

In December 2020, an evaluation of the Forges Mondière revealed that the structure was in imminent danger of collapse. This determination was based on observing severe degradation in certain areas of the timber frames. In response, the municipal authorities took measures to secure the building with support beams, while also initiating the process of planning for future restoration efforts.

== Plans for tourism development ==
Since 1984, the city of Thiers has conducted studies to rehabilitate the Forges Mondière and transform the site into a branch of the Museum of Cutlery, focusing particularly on 20th-century industry.

=== Historical context ===
At the turn of the 21st century, the economy of Thiers, with its historical reliance on the cutlery mono-industry, underwent significant transformations. These changes initially took place at the economic level, marked by a reconversion and diversification of activities based on traditional trades such as mechanics, forging, and plastics processing. Spatially, businesses moved from the Vallée des Usines and the old town center to the plains. This transition was facilitated by the advent of new energy sources, such as electricity, and was driven by the scarcity of available space and the accessibility challenges in these older districts. An initial focus was placed on revitalizing the medieval town to reverse the trends of disintegration and decline in the upper town. This endeavor included the establishment of the Museum of Cutlery on its namesake street in 1982. However, the valley remained excluded from these revitalization efforts until the mid-1980s, when the Thiers municipality initiated discussions to breathe new life into an underappreciated industrial heritage.

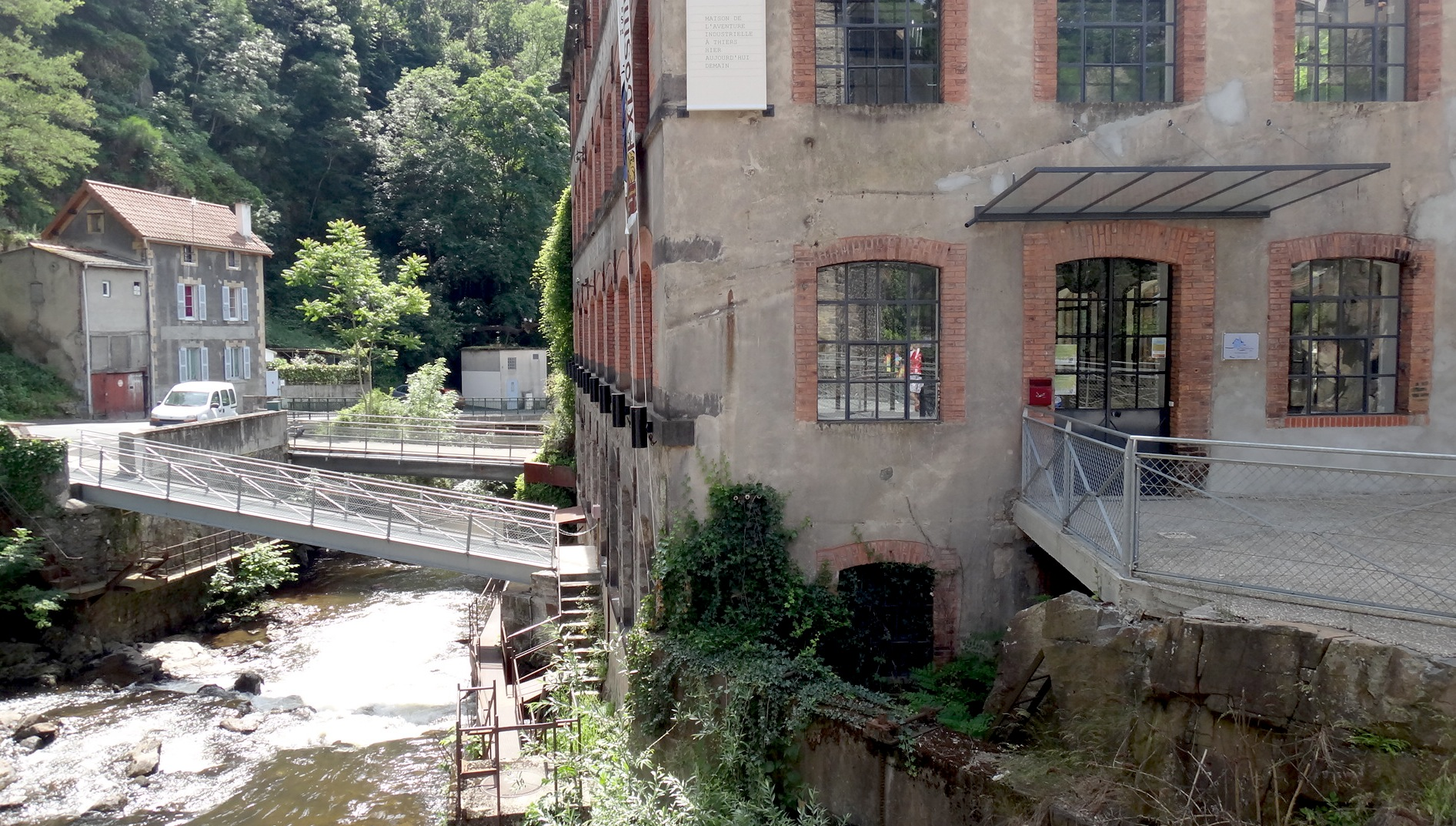
The May factory, rehabilitated in 2009, seen from the main entrance to Forges Mondière.

=== Objectives ===
This enhancement was part of a comprehensive initiative encompassing projects of various types. First, a cultural project was initiated in which the valley played a role in the broader efforts focused on the historic town center at the time. This initiative aimed to promote the preservation of significant industrial heritage and the transmission of artisanal knowledge. Second, an economic project was implemented to renovate existing facilities and attract new artisans and industrial creators to the area. The inclusion of an urban project was predicated on the valley's status as a significant land and real estate reserve close to the city center. Notwithstanding the valley's marginalization in the early 1980s, the municipality prioritized the rehabilitation of key sites that defined the identity of the Vallée des Usines, including the Creux de l'Enfer factory, the May factory, and the Forges Mondière. Of these, the Forges Mondière factory was regarded as the most promising location due to its integration of architecture and urban landscape with the surrounding environment, particularly the river and natural surroundings. Notably, the Forges Mondière factory featured an innovative hydraulic energy exploitation system, which garnered significant attention for its advanced technology and sustainability.

=== Mixed results ===
In 1985, the National Symposium on Monumental Metal Sculpture was held to symbolically initiate the enhancement of the Vallée des Usines. This event showcased an imposing work by George Trakas between the Forges Mondière and the Entraygues factory. In 1988, the Creux de l'Enfer factory was fully renovated to host a contemporary art center. In the early 1990s, the municipality of Thiers undertook the rehabilitation of another factory to attract new employment opportunities to the site. Subsequently, in 1998, the Vallée des Rouets officially opened, thereby highlighting the grindstones further upstream on the Durolle, where grinders once worked.

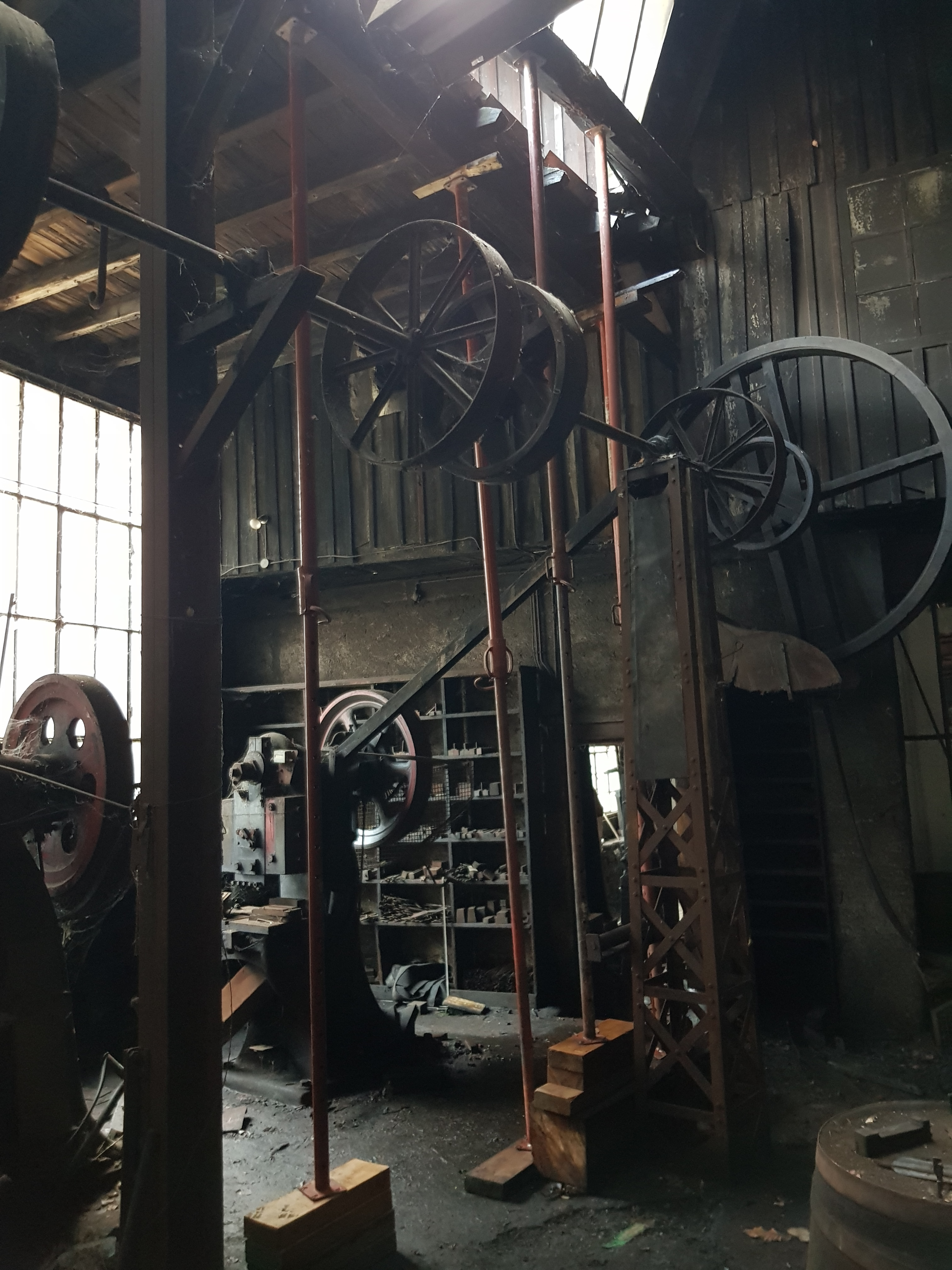
The roof is now supported by props in places.

By 2009, the municipality, under the leadership of Thierry Déglon, who had succeeded Maurice Adevah-Pœuf in 2001, had completed the renovation of the May factory. However, this renovation did not include the continuation of the comprehensive project for the valley that had been proposed by the previous administration from the 1980s to 2001. Despite the emergence of novel considerations in 2004 concerning the technical viability of restoring the Forges Mondière, no additional restoration work was undertaken at the site.

=== Toward a new dynamic ===
The municipal administration, elected in 2020, has proposed an ambitious program to revitalize the Vallée des Usines and the Forges Mondière, recognizing their significant tourism, economic, urban, cultural, and symbolic potential. This program includes plans for a sound and light festival and the rehabilitation of buildings such as the Creux de l'Enfer and the Forges Mondière. By the end of December 2020, the municipal government of Thiers had declared its intention to "explore all available funding sources" to preserve the Forges Mondière building, emphasizing the potential for collaboration with the Heritage Foundation. Concurrently, municipal authorities took measures to secure the structure, which, by December 2020, was at risk of imminent collapse.

== Architecture ==
=== Exterior design ===
The primary structure is situated within the profound Vallée des Usines, with rock formations encircling it in the posterior section, thereby serving as a natural barrier. Access to the factory is facilitated by a metal-framed bridge with a concrete deck. Approximately three-quarters of the exterior walls are adorned with expansive rectangular glass windows. The roof, constructed in the shed style, features numerous wooden lanterns and encompasses the majority of the factory, with a minor portion employing a single-pitch design.

An annex building, which formerly housed administrative offices, is located on the opposite side of the river and can be accessed directly from Avenue Joseph-Claussat without crossing a bridge. This annex is constructed from granite rubble masonry with a coated finish, and its gable roof features three overhanging dormers.

=== Interior design ===
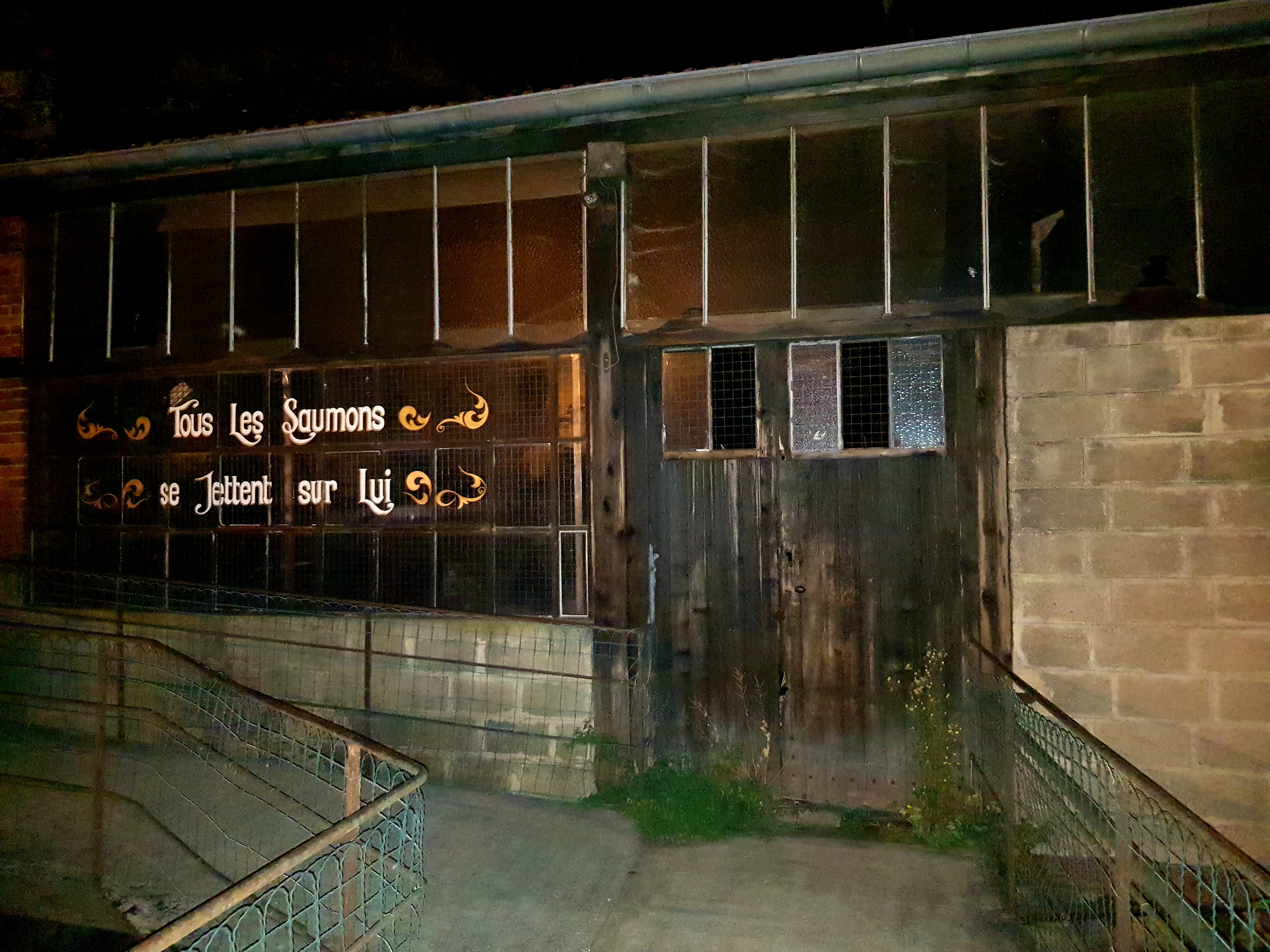
Factory entrance before lock replacement.

Following the factory's closure, the city of Thiers acquired the building, and no machinery was removed or relocated. The former factory contains spring or plank power hammers (also known as "trip hammers") operated by wooden pulleys driven by the Durolle River. Equipment such as tempering stations, punching machines, upsetting presses, forging presses, hammering machines, and annealing machines are still in place. The workstations, which include wooden benches and wrought-iron tables, are utilized for the handling of unfinished knife blades, unassembled wooden handles, and raw steel bars. The wooden shelves, affixed to 20th-century concrete and cinder block walls, serve as storage for nearly finished knives. The back wall of the factory, which was constructed directly onto the rock, is supported by semicircular barrel vaults.

The rear wall of the factory is constructed directly onto the bedrock and is supported by barrel vaults of a semicircular configuration. Four workshops have been identified, and constructed successively, and the oldest part of the building corresponds to the former location of the water wheel. This part is made of granite rubble masonry. Remnants of a sluiceway in the basement indicate that a vertical paddle wheel powered by the Durolle River once operated the machinery. The primary workshop's construction comprises timber framing infilled with granite rubble, concrete blocks, bricks, and wooden planks.

List of items in the Palissy database
Cataloged Items	Reference Code	Cataloged Items	Reference Code
Board Trip Hammer	IVR83_20016300972	Punch Cutting Machine (8)	IVR83_20016300974
Board Trip Hammer (2)	IVR83_20016300970	Board Trip Hammer (8)	IVR83_20016300973
Spring Trip Hammer	IVR83_20016300968	Board Trip Hammer (9)	IVR83_20016300971
Board Trip Hammer (3)	IVR83_20016300964	Spring Trip Hammer (3)	IVR83_20016300969
Quenching Station	IVR83_20016300960	Board Trip Hammer (10)	IVR83_20016300967
Punch Cutting Machine	IVR83_20016300955	Board Trip Hammer (11)	IVR83_20016300966
Punch Cutting Machine (2)	IVR83_20016300954	Board Trip Hammer (12)	IVR83_20016300965
Display Stand	IVR83_19996303762	Quenching Station	IVR83_20016300963
Board Trip Hammer (4)	IVR83_19996303757	Quenching Station (2)	IVR83_20016300962
Board Trip Hammer (5)	IVR83_19996303753	Quenching Station (3)	IVR83_20016300961
Spring Trip Hammer (2)	IVR83_19996303752	Punch Cutting Machine (9)	IVR83_20006301090
Set of 4 Transmission Systems	IVR83_19996303751	Punch Cutting Machine (10)	IVR83_20006301089
Board Trip Hammer (6)	IVR83_19996303750	Board Trip Hammer (13)	IVR83_20006301088
Punch Cutting Machine (3)	IVR83_19996303749	Punch Cutting Machine (11)	IVR83_20006301087
Punch Cutting Machine (4)	IVR83_19996303748	Punch Cutting Machine (12)	IVR83_20006301086
Punch Cutting Machine (5)	IVR83_19996303741	Annealing Oven (2)	IVR83_20006301085
Punch Cutting Machine (6)	IVR83_19996303740	Quenching Station (4)	IVR83_20006301084
Board Trip Hammer (7)	IVR83_19996303747	Quenching Station (5)	IVR83_20006301083
Annealing Oven	IVR83_19996303737	Board Trip Hammer (14)	IVR83_20006301082
Punch Cutting Machine (7)	IVR83_20016300975	Board Trip Hammer (15)	IVR83_20006301081
Spring Trip Hammer (4)	IVR83_20006301079	Spring Trip Hammer (4)	IVR83_20006301079

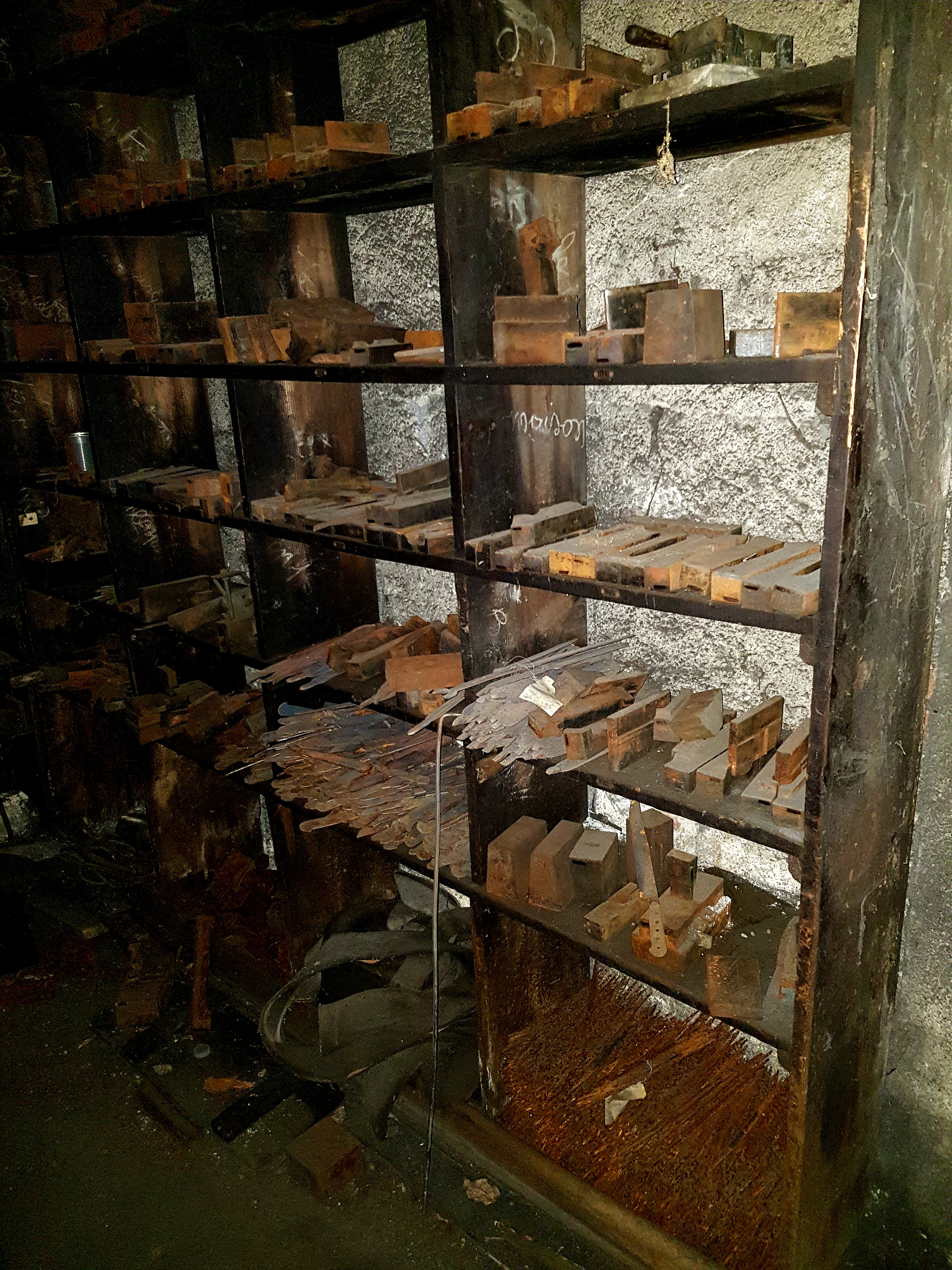
A shelf with rusty blades.

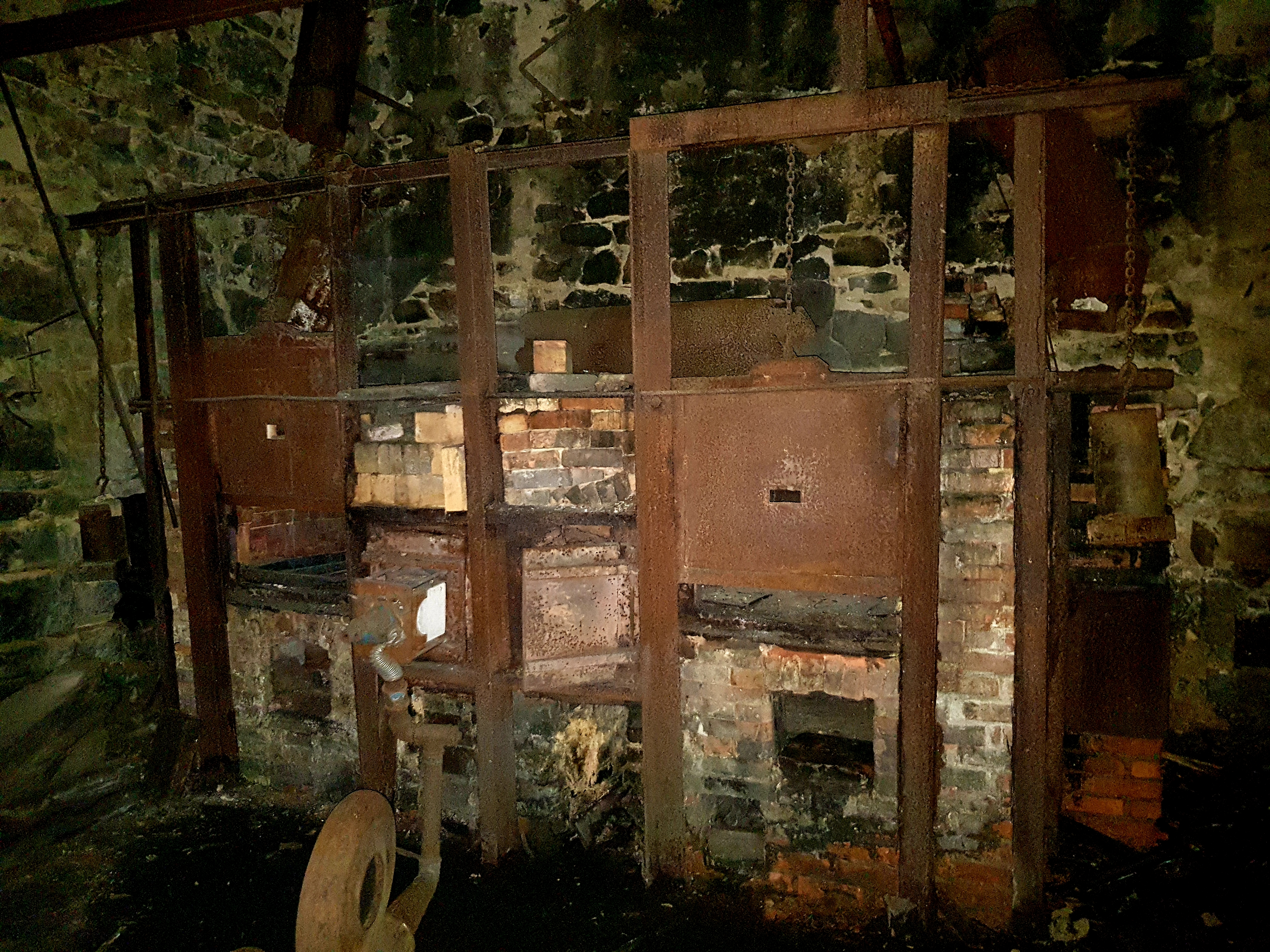
An annealing furnace.

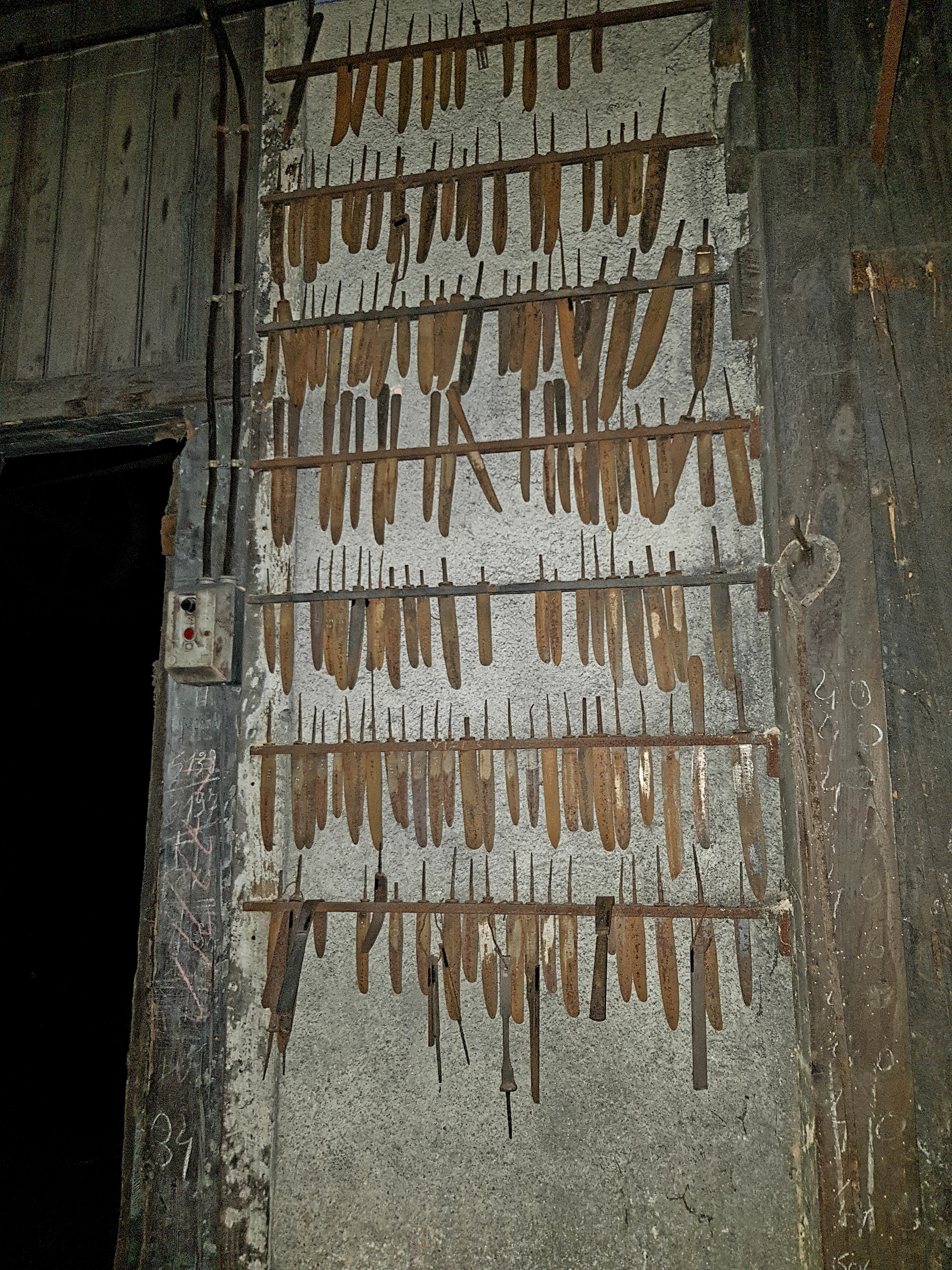
A display stand.

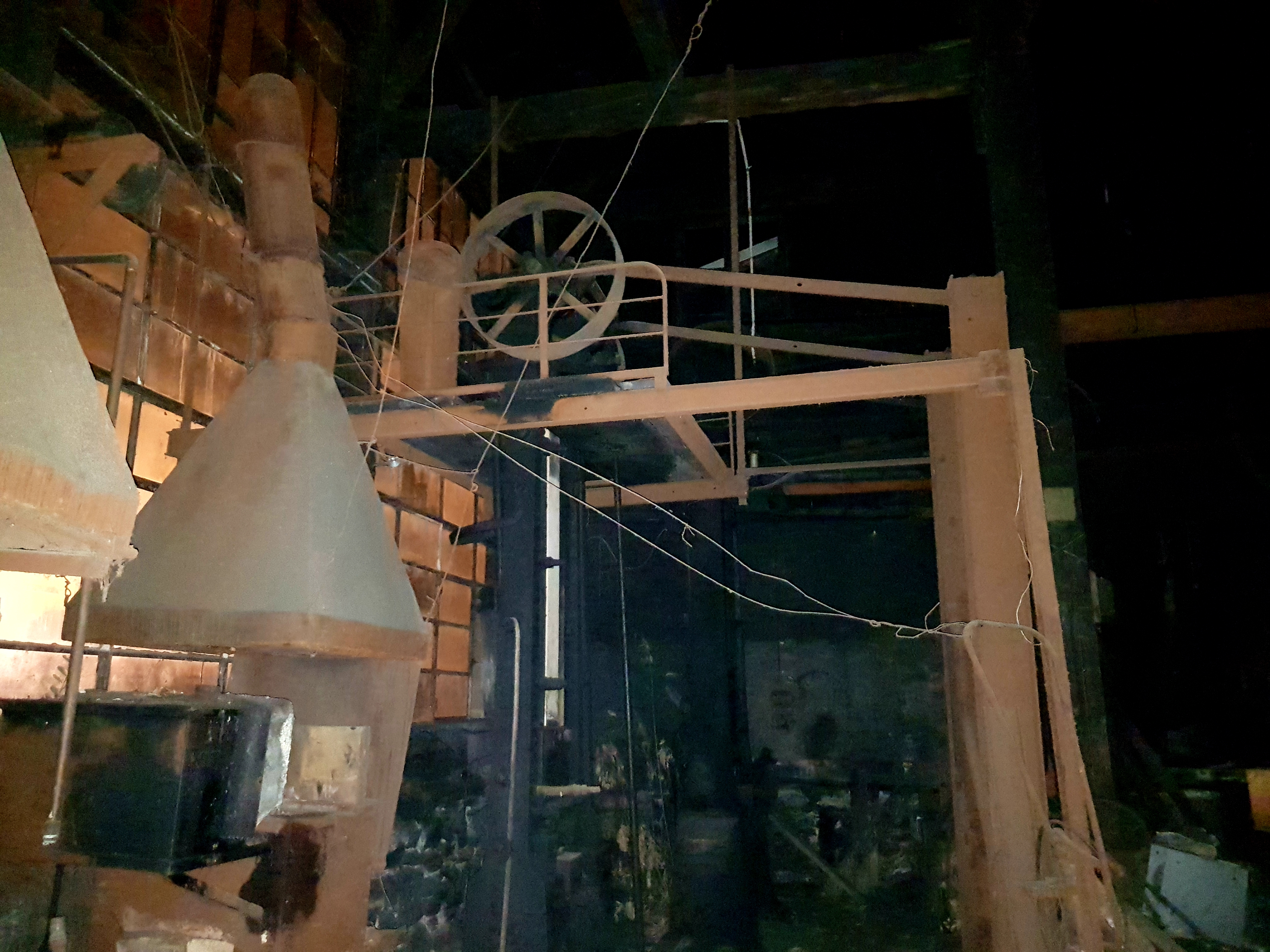
A transmission system.

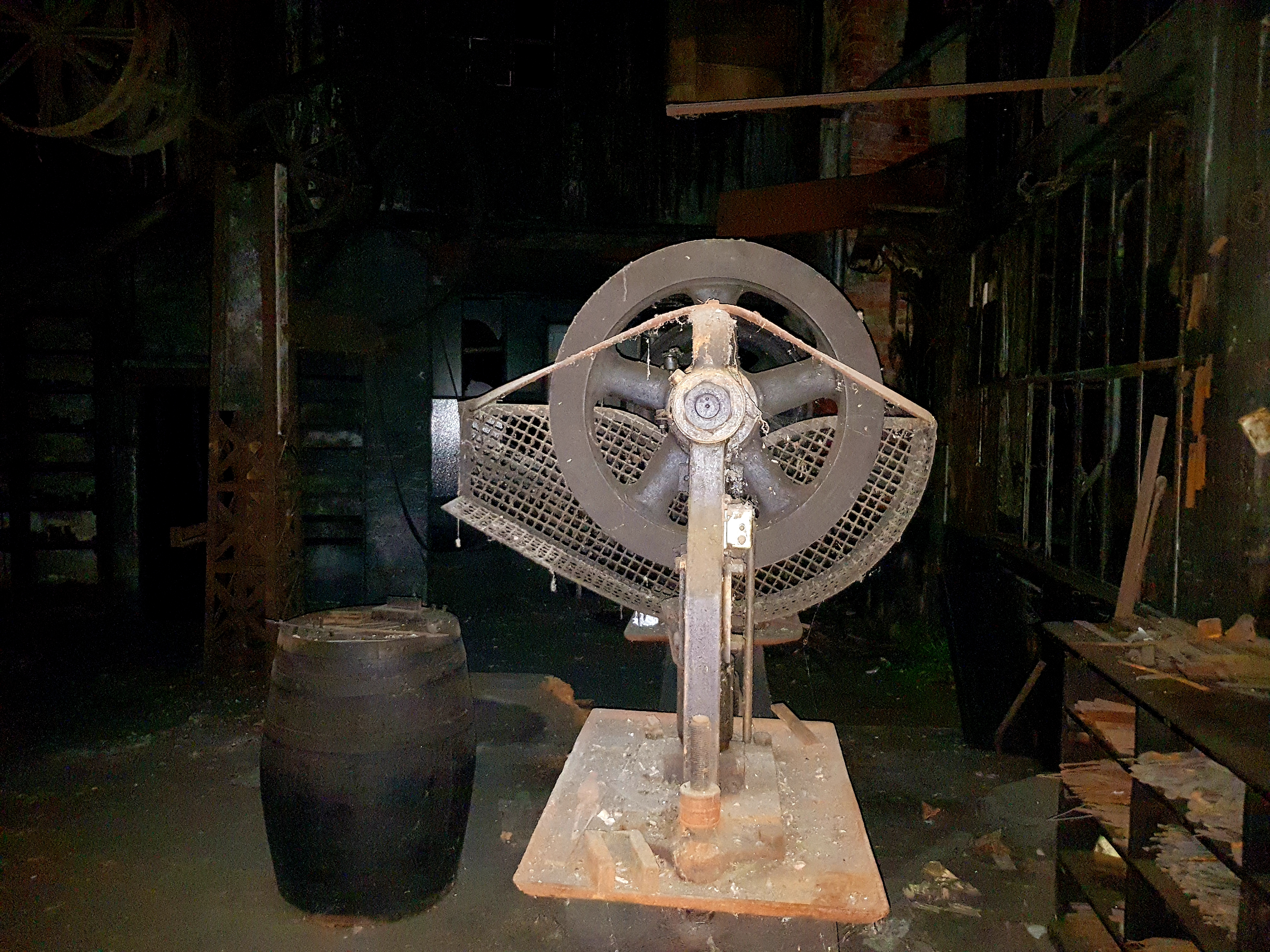
A punch-cutting machine.

== The forges Mondière in the arts ==
In 2017, the artist Mireille Fustier incorporated elements of the former cutlery factory and the cascade at Creux de l'Enfer into her artistic oeuvre. Drawing inspiration from the local topography, she directed her attention to the structures of the Vallée des Usines, with a particular emphasis on the Creux de l'Enfer, the May factory, and the Forges Mondière. The novel La Ville noire (1860) by George Sand features a section of the story set at the May factory, located adjacent to the Forges Mondière.

In 2019, the pop group L'Impératrice filmed scenes for their music video, Là-haut, in front of two notable industrial sites: the Creux de l'Enfer and the May factory. These sites have a rich history, as evidenced by a 2015 documentary created by the WEBTV Livradois Forez association. This documentary delved into the history of the factory and included footage filmed inside the building in collaboration with the city of Thiers.

== See also ==
- Thiers, Puy-de-Dôme
- Vallée des Usines
- Creux de l'Enfer
- Vallée des Rouets

== Bibliography ==
- Lefebvre, Magali; Chabanne, Jérôme; Musée de la coutellerie (2005). Vallée des usines : regards croisés [Valley of the factories: crossed views] (in French). Thiers: Ville de Thiers. ISBN 2-35145-008-6. Archived from the original on June 3, 2023.
- Combe, Paul (1922). "Thiers et la vallée industrielle de la Durolle" [Thiers and the industrial Durolle valley]. Annales de Géographie (in French). 31 (172). Thiers: A. Colin: 360–365. doi:10.3406/geo.1922.10136. Archived from the original on February 12, 2023.
- Combe, Paul (1956). Thiers : les origines, l'évolution des industries thiernoises, leur avenir [Thiers: the origins, development and future of Thiers' industries] (in French). Thiers: G. de Bussac. Archived from the original on June 3, 2023.
- Hadjadj, Dany (1999). Pays de Thiers : le regard et la mémoire [Pays de Thiers: a look and a memory] (in French) (2nd ed.). Thiers: Presses Univ Blaise Pascal. ISBN 2-84516-116-6. Archived from the original on June 3, 2023.
- Simon, Anthony (2002). La pluriactivité dans l'agriculture des montagnes françaises : un territoire, des hommes, une pratique [Pluriactivity in French mountain agriculture: a territory, a people, a practice] (in French) (2nd ed.). Clermont-Ferrand: Presses Univ Blaise Pascal. ISBN 978-2-84516-192-4. Archived from the original on December 3, 2024.
