= Alexis Bachelay =

French politician

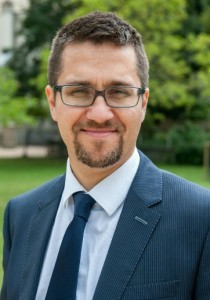

Deputy Mayor of Colombes
- Incumbent
- Assumed office 3 July 2020
- Mayor: Patrick Chaimovitch

Member of the National Assembly for Hauts-de-Seine's 1st constituency
- In office 20 June 2012 – 20 June 2017
- Preceded by: Roland Muzeau
- Succeeded by: Elsa Faucillon

Personal details
- Born: 19 August 1973 (age 53) Saint-Maur-des-Fossés, France
- Party: Socialist Party
- Education: Paris 1 Panthéon-Sorbonne University

Alexis Bachelay (born 19 August 1973) is a French politician.

Bachelay was born in Saint-Maur-des-Fossés on 19 August 1973. He was elected to the National Assembly in 2012, and represented Hauts-de-Seine's 1st constituency on behalf of the Socialist Party. On 3 July 2020, when Patrick Chaimovitch took office as mayor of Colombes, Bachelay was elected a deputy mayor alongside Fatoumata Sow, by a vote of the municipal council.
