= Elsa Faucillon =

French politician (born 1981)

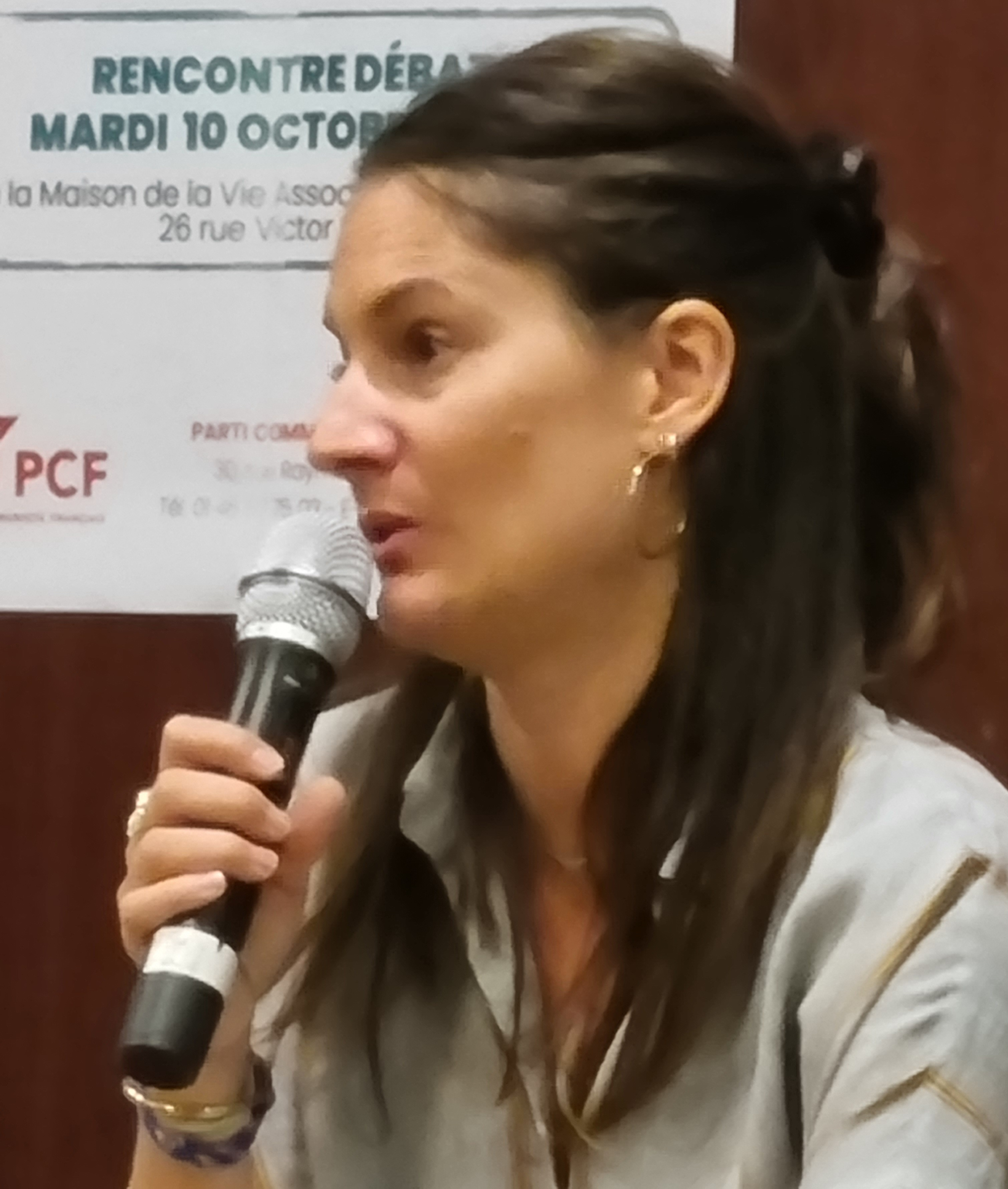
- Elsa Faucillon in 2023

Member of the National Assembly for Hauts-de-Seine's 1st constituency
- Incumbent
- Assumed office 21 June 2017
- Preceded by: Alexis Bachelay

Personal details
- Born: 6 August 1981 (age 45) Amiens, France
- Party: French Communist Party
- Children: 1
- Education: Paris 1 Panthéon-Sorbonne University

Elsa Faucillon (born 6 August 1981) is a French politician. She is a member of the National Assembly representing Hauts-de-Seine's 1st constituency.
