= Puy-de-Dôme's 5th constituency =

Constituency of the National Assembly of France

5th constituency of Puy-de-Dôme
- inline Constituency of the National Assembly of France

- Puy-de-Dôme's's 5th Constituency shown within Puy-de-Dôme

- Puy-de-Dôme in France
- Deputy: André Chassaigne; PCF
- Department: Puy-de-Dôme
- Cantons: (pre-2015) Ambert, Arlanc, Châteldon, Courpière, Cunlhat, Lezoux, Maringues, Olliergues, Saint-Amant-Roche-Savine, Saint-Anthème, Saint-Germain-l'Herm, Saint-Rémy-sur-Durolle, Thiers, Viverols

The 5th constituency of Puy-de-Dôme is a French legislative constituency in Puy-de-Dôme. It covers the east of the department, and has been held by André Chassaigne of the French Communist Party since 2002.

== Historic representation ==
Election	Member	Party
1988	Maurice Adevah-Pœuf	PS
1993	Jean-Marc Chartoire	UDF
1997	Maurice Adevah-Pœuf	PS
2002	André Chassaigne	PCF
2007	André Chassaigne	PCF
2012	André Chassaigne	PCF
2017	André Chassaigne	PCF
2022	André Chassaigne	PCF
2024	André Chassaigne	PCF

== Election results ==
=== 2024 ===
Legislative Election 2024: Puy-de-Dôme's 5th constituency
Party	Candidate	Votes	%	±%
RE (Ensemble)	Véronique Bastet	11,166	15.54	−1.98
LR	Yves Courthaliac	6,154	8.57	+0.98
LO	Gabrielle Capron	783	1.09	n/a
PCF (NFP)	André Chassaigne	27,137	37.78	−11.35
RN	Brigitte Carletto	26,595	37.02	+17.96
Turnout		71,835	97.15	+45.97
Registered electors		105,052		
2nd round result
PCF	André Chassaigne	38,293	55.27	−14.16
RN	Brigitte Carletto	30,993	44.73	+14.16
Turnout		69,286	92.89	+45.65
Registered electors		105,057		
PCF hold		Swing		

=== 2022 ===
Legislative Election 2022: Puy-de-Dôme's 5th constituency
Party	Candidate	Votes	%	±%
PCF (NUPÉS)	André Chassaigne	25,686	49.13	+2.89
RN	Brigitte Carletto	9,964	19.06	+9.11
LREM (Ensemble)	Karine Legrand	9,157	17.52	−11.75
LR (UDC)	Yves Courthaliac	4,172	7.98	−2.64
REC	Jérémy Prévost	1,328	2.54	N/A
Others	N/A	2,023	-	−
Turnout		52,280	51.18	−1.59
2nd round result
PCF (NUPÉS)	André Chassaigne	30,966	69.43	+5.88
RN	Brigitte Carletto	13,633	30.57	N/A
Turnout		44,599	47.24	−2.73
PCF hold				

=== 2017 ===
Results of the 11 June and 18 June 2017 French National Assembly election in Puy-de-Dôme's 5th Constituency
Candidate	Party		1st round		2nd round	
Candidate	Party		Votes	%	Votes	%
André Chassaigne	Communist Party	PCF	18,444	34.85	30,620	63.55
Sébastien Gardette	La République En Marche!	LREM	15,491	29.27	17,561	36.45
Jérôme Jayet	National Front	FN	5,267	9.95		
Myriam Fougère	The Republicans	LR	5,125	9.68		
Sara Perret	La France Insoumise	FI	3,612	6.82		
Gérard Betenfeld	Socialist Party	PS	1,704	3.22		
Jérémy Prévost	Debout la France	DLF	845	1.60		
Claire Lespagnol	Ecologist	ECO	716	1.35		
Mikaël Montagnon	Ecologist	ECO	669	1.26		
Florence Dinouard	Union of Democrats and Independents	UDI	495	0.94		
Jeannine Laubreton	Independent	DIV	320	0.60		
Gabrielle Capron	Far Left	EXG	238	0.45		
Total			52,926	100%	48,181	100%
Registered voters			102,060		102,047	
Blank/Void ballots			932	1.73%	2,813	5.52%
Turnout			53,858	52.77%	50,994	49.97%
Abstentions			48,202	47.23%	51,053	50.03%
Result					PCF GAIN FROM FG	

=== 2012 ===
Results of the 10 June and 17 June 2012 French National Assembly election in Puy-de-Dôme’s 5th Constituency
Candidate	Party		1st round		2nd round	
Candidate	Party		Votes	%	Votes	%
André Chassaigne	Left Front	FG	24,523	41.16	37,273	67.53
Maxime Costilhes	Union for a Popular Movement	UMP	11,936	20.03	17,923	32.47
Martine Munoz	Socialist Party	PS	10,987	18.44		
Erik Faurot	National Front	FN	7,541	12.66		
Michel Sauvade	Democratic Movement	MoDem	2,045	3.43		
Hubert Constancias	Europe Ecology – The Greens	EELV	935	1.57		
Patricia Gerbaud	Radical Party	PR	452	0.76		
Philippe De Freitas	Le Trèfle	LT	386	0.65		
Sandrine Clavières	Communist Party	NPA	277	0.46		
Michèle Decombas	Independent Ecological Alliance	AEI	267	0.45		
Gabrielle Capron	Worker’s Struggle	LO	227	0.38		
Total			59,576	100%	55,196	100%
Registered voters			100,343		100,327	
Blank/Void ballots			1,050	1.73%	2,128	3.71%
Turnout			60,626	60.42%	57,324	57.14%
Abstentions			39,717	39.58%	43,003	42.86%
Result					FG HOLD	

=== 2007 ===
Legislative Election 2007: Puy-de-Dôme's 5th constituency
Party	Candidate	Votes	%	±%
PCF	André Chassaigne	17,979	43.76	
UMP	Anne-Marie Delannoy	12,068	29.37	
PS	Martine Munoz	4,403	10.72	
MoDem	Bernard Lacroix	2,321	5.65	
FN	Eric Faurot	1,263	3.07	
Others	N/A	3,050	-	−
Turnout		41,950	63.25	
2nd round result
PCF	André Chassaigne	27,819	65.90	
UMP	Anne-Marie Delannoy	14,393	34.10	
Turnout		43,314	65.27	
PCF hold				

=== 2002 ===
Legislative Election 2002: Puy-de-Dôme's 5th constituency
Party	Candidate	Votes	%	±%
UMP	Marie-Gabrielle Gagnadre	16,999	40.53	
PCF	André Chassaigne	9,604	22.90	
PS	Martine Munoz	8,282	19.75	
FN	Jacques Chanet	3,848	9.17	
Others	N/A	3,209	-	−
Turnout		43,160	66.44	
2nd round result
PCF	André Chassaigne	20,944	51.34	
UMP	Marie-Gabrielle Gagnadre	19,852	48.66	
Turnout		42,356	65.21	
PCF gain from PS				

=== 1997 ===
Legislative Election 1997: Puy-de-Dôme's 5th constituency
Party	Candidate	Votes	%	±%
UDF	Jean-Marc Chartoire	12,213	29.38	
PS	Maurice Adevah-Pœuf	11,585	27.86	
PCF	André Chassaigne	8,403	20.21	
FN	Jacques Chanet	4,954	11.92	
LO	Claude Dufour	1,199	2.88	
MEI	Hubert Constancias	1,178	2.83	
LDI	Claude Bonnot	988	2.38	
GE	Jean-Luc Vincent	869	2.09	
DIV	Patrick Chanier	187	0.45	
Turnout		44,397	69.12	
2nd round result
PS	Maurice Adevah-Pœuf	23,264	53.13	
UDF	Jean-Marc Chartoire	20,526	46.87	
Turnout		47,644	74.20	
PS gain from UDF				
