= Roland Muzeau =

French politician

Member of the National Assembly for Hauts-de-Seine's 1st constituency
- In office 20 June 2007 – 19 June 2012
- Preceded by: Jacques Brunhes
- Succeeded by: Alexis Bachelay

President of the Democratic and Republican Left in the National Assembly
- In office 29 November 2011 – 19 June 2012
- Preceded by: Yves Cochet
- Succeeded by: André Chassaigne

Member of the French Senate for Hauts-de-Seine
- In office 29 March 2000 – 28 June 2007
- Preceded by: Michel Duffour
- Succeeded by: Brigitte Gonthier-Maurin

Personal details
- Born: 5 November 1951 (age 74) La Garenne-Colombes, France
- Party: French Communist Party

Roland Muzeau (born 5 November 1951 in La Garenne-Colombes) was a member of the National Assembly of France. He represented the first constituency of the Hauts-de-Seine department, and is a member of the French Communist Party, which sits in the Assembly with the Democratic and Republican Left.

== Biography ==
Roland Muzeau worked as a toolmaker at Safran Aircraft Engines in Gennevilliers from 1969 to 1988.

He became senator for Hauts-de-Seine on March 29, 2000, replacing Michel Duffour, who had been appointed minister. He is a member of the Social Affairs Committee. From October 5, 2001, to June 28, 2007, he was appointed vice-chairman of this committee.

On June 17, 2007, he was elected representative of the 1st district of Hauts-de-Seine with 63.54% of the vote and resigned from his position as senator.

In the 2012 elections, Roland Muzeau lost his seat as deputy when he withdrew in favor of the Socialist candidate Alexis Bachelay, who came out on top in the first round with 32.51% of the vote against 29.76%.
