= Jacques Gautier =

French politician

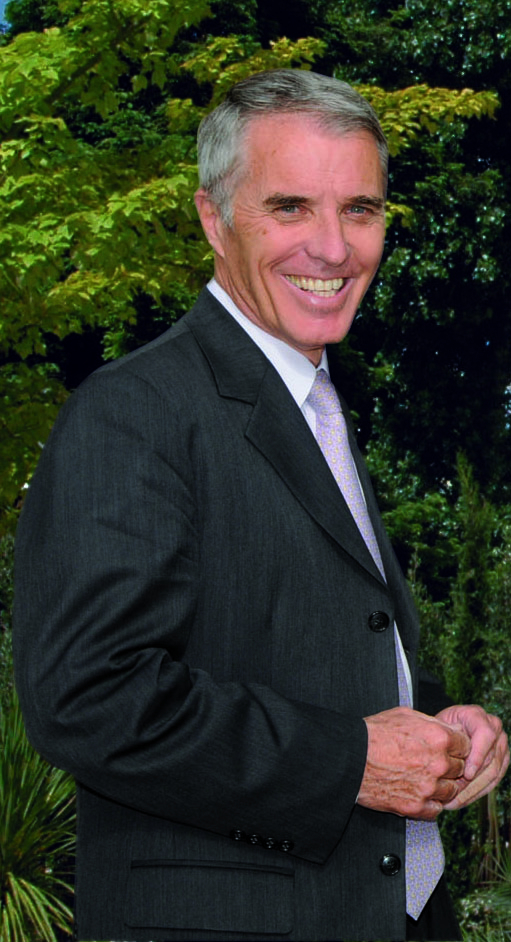
Gautier in 2012

Jacques Gautier (born 18 September 1946 in Aix-en-Provence) is a French politician and a member of the Senate of France. He represents the Hauts-de-Seine department and is a member of the Union for a Popular Movement Party.
