= Brigitte Gonthier-Maurin =

French politician (born 1956)

Brigitte Gonthier-Maurin (born 23 April 1956) is a former member of the Senate of France, representing the Hauts-de-Seine department from 2007 to 2017. She is a member of the Communist, Republican, and Citizen Group.

== Biography ==
Brigitte Gonthier-Maurin was departmental secretary of the Hauts-de-Seine federation of the French Communist Party from 2004 to February 2013. From the 33rd congress (2006) until 2007, she was also a member of the PCF's National Executive Committee, responsible for the network of section secretaries(Party Life division).

In March 2005, she ran in the special legislative election in the 6th district of Hauts-de-Seine (held following Nicolas Sarkozy departure from the government). She obtained 2.6% and 624 votes, compared to 1.18% and 478 votes in 2002 (4.68% compared to 2.22% in Puteaux).

She was a senator for Hauts-de-Seine from 2007 to 2017, succeeding Roland Muzeau, who was elected to the position of deputy in the legislative elections of June 2007. She was re-elected on September 25, 2011. In the Senate, she is a member of the Committee on Culture, Education, and Communication.

She was chair of the Senate's women's rights delegation from 2011 to 2014.

In June 2014, she was found guilty of having benefited, between 1995 and 2003, while employed by Works council since 1977, from a fictitious job paid for by the EDF works council, where she was supposed to be working with President Jean Lavielle while actually carrying out her activities at the Hauts-de-Seine Communist Party federation[5]. She was sentenced to a 10-month suspended prison term.

== Bibliography ==
- Page on the Senate website (in French)
