= Dominique Frelaut =

French politician (1927–2018)

Dominique Frelaut (2 September 1927 – 9 July 2018) was a French politician. A member of the French Communist Party, Frelaut was mayor of Colombes from 1965 to 2001, and elected to the National Assembly between 1973 and 1986, and again from 2001 to 2002.

== Life and career ==
Frelaut was born in Vannes on 2 September 1927. His father Jean was a painter. The younger Frelaut was active in several labor unions and joined the French Communist Party in 1947. Frelaut was first elected mayor of Colombes in 1965, and served for 36 years until 2001. He won reelection several times against Alain Aubert, and was eventually unseated by Nicole Gouetta. While mayor of Colombes, Frelaut additionally represented Hauts-de-Seine in the National Assembly from 1973 to 1986. When his mayoralty ended, Frelaut returned to the assembly as an alternate member on behalf of Jacques Brunhes between 2001 and 2002. Frelaut died on 9 July 2018, aged 90, and his funeral was held on 13 July 2018.
