= André Aubry =

French politician (1931–2025)

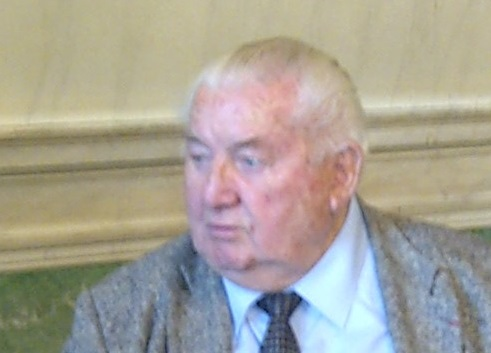
- Aubry in 2012

Member of the French Senate for Hauts-de-Seine
- In office 22 September 1968 – 2 October 1977

Mayor of Antony
- In office 30 March 1977 – 15 June 1983
- Preceded by: Georges Suant
- Succeeded by: Patrick Devedjian

Member of the General Council of Hauts-de-Seine for the Canton of Antony
- In office 14 March 1976 – 20 October 1988
- Preceded by: Georges Suant
- Succeeded by: Jean-Paul Dova

Personal details
- Born: 1 August 1931 Valognes, France
- Died: 14 November 2025 (aged 94)
- Political party: PCF
- Occupation: Metalworker

André Aubry (French: [ɑ̃dʁe obʁi]; 1 August 1931 – 14 November 2025) was a French politician of the French Communist Party (PCF).

== Life and career ==
Born in Valognes on 1 August 1931, Aubry was the son of two SNCF employees and held a certificat d'aptitude professionnelle as a metalworker. His career in Antony started as he joined the PCF and the General Confederation of Labour in 1947. He led the Hauts-de-Seine regional bureau of the Mouvement Jeunes Communistes de France in the 1950s and was also active with Secours Populaire Français.

In 1955, Aubry was elected to the municipal council of Antony, where he stayed until 1965. He was elected to the Senate in 1968 and to the General Council of Hauts-de-Seine in 1976. In 1977, he was elected mayor of Antony and therefore resigned from his seat in the Senate. In 1983, he was re-elected mayor of Antony, but the result was annulled due to electoral fraud, and Rally for the Republic candidate Patrick Devedjian defeated Aubry by 697 votes. He remained on the municipal council until 2008, opposing the urban planning policies of his successor. He also directed a weekly newspaper titled Antony-Hebdo until 2012. From 2007 to 2015, he was president of the Association d'amitié franco-coréenne.

Aubry died on 14 November 2025, at the age of 94.
