= Bertrand Badré =

French private banker

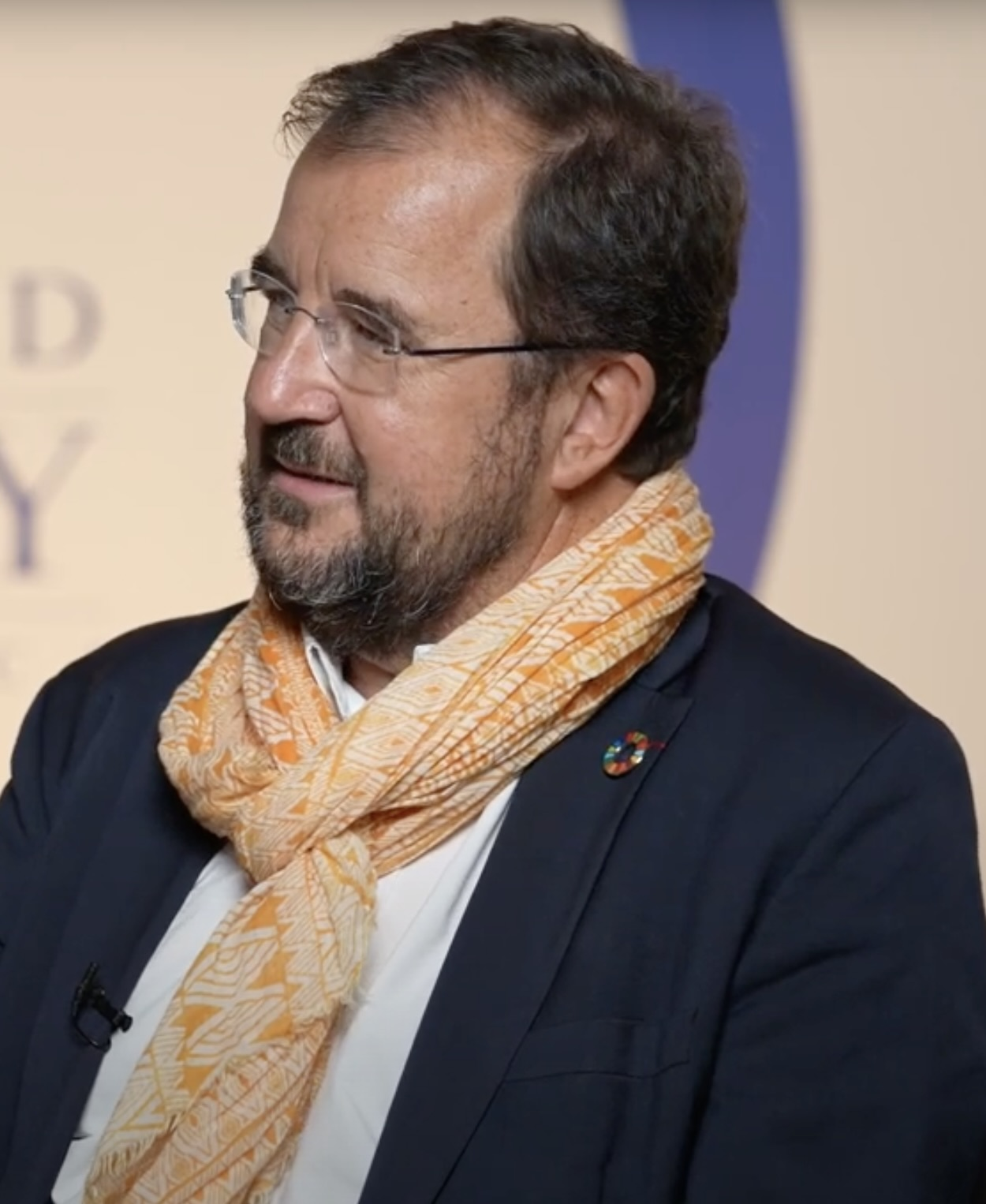
- Born: 10 May 1968 (age 58); Versailles, France
- Education: HEC Paris; Sciences Po, ÉNA
- Occupations: CFO of the World Bank, CEO and Founding Partner of BlueOrange Capital, CFO and Managing Director of the World Bank, previous former Group CFO of Société Générale and Crédit Agricole, former partner at Lazard. https://www.bertrandbadre.com/

Bertrand Badré was born on 10 May 1968. He is the son of Denis Badré, Senator of Hauts-de-Seine until 2011 and mayor of Ville d'Avray. Bertrand Badré is the CEO and founder of BlueOrange Capital, an investment fund that focuses on investments aligned with the Sustainable Development Goals with market level financial returns. Previously, Badré served as managing director and Chief Financial Officer of the World Bank Group. Badré also held key positions at Société Générale, Crédit Agricole and Lazard, and was an advisor to previous French President Jacques Chirac’s diplomatic team. His most recent book, “Money Honnie, si la finance sauvait le monde?” explores Badré's experience throughout the financial crisis and how we can reboot the system.

== Biography ==
Badré holds a master's degree in history from La Sorbonne, after graduating from the business school HEC Paris in 1989. He also attended the ENA (École nationale d'administration) and Sciences Po. Badré began his career in 1989 at BFI-Ibexsa, a Franco-American company that is now part of Avnet. From 1995 to 1999, he worked at the French Ministry of Finance, where he led a number of control, audit and consultancy missions for the French National Audit Office, "Inspection Générale des Finances."

In 1999, Badré joined Lazard, where he became vice president in the London office, Director in the New York office, and managing director in the Paris office.

In 2002, Badré was a member of the World Panel on Financing Water Infrastructure chaired by Michel Camdessus, a panel of financial experts to assess ways of attracting resources to the water field.

In 2003, Badré joined President Jacques Chirac’s office in Paris as Advisor and Deputy Africa Personal Representative. In this capacity he supported the organization of the Evian G8 Summit including the G8 Water Plan and G8-Nepad partnership. His participation in key international summits (AIDS, Water, UN General Assembly) contributed to designing the financial concept and structure leading to the Iffim/GAVI preliminary discussions. Badré was also involved in drafting the “Landau Report”.

In 2007, Badré became Group Chief Financial Officer of Crédit Agricole Group. During his time at Crédit Agricole, Badré also served as Vice Chairman of SFEF, the vehicle created by the government to support banks and financing of the Economy in 2008. Between 2012 and 2013, Badré held the office of Group Chief Financial Officer of Société Générale Group. He directed treasury, planning and control, accounting, strategy and M&A in a peak crisis period.

In 2013, Badré was appointed managing director and CFO of the World Bank Group, becoming G7 and G20 Finance Deputy and a member of the Financial Stability Board. His tenure oversaw a balance sheet optimization, the creation of a finance and risk committee, as well as the complete restructuring of the planning process. Badré’s time at the Bank was also marked by a conflict with staff over a very unusual $94,000 “bonus” he had requested from Jim Yong Kim to top his compensation. The bonus was deemed unethical and in contradiction with the Bank’s culture, and Badré had to renounce to it. This incident partially explains the short length of his tenure (2013-2016) there.

He also co-chairs the Global Future Council of the World Economic Forum on Sustainable Development, Public Private Cooperation and International Governance, which promotes the same ideas.

In 2016, Badré founded BlueOrange, which seeks to connect investors interested in combining market level financial returns with measurable social, economic, and environmental returns. In June 2020, Blue like Orange Sustainable Capital closed its first fund, raising just over $200 million for its Latin America Fund.

Bertrand Badré is a member of the French-American Foundation and an alumnus of the German Marshall Fund of the US. He is also part of the Board of Directors of the French Aspen Institute.

Badré is co-sponsor of the One Planet Lab, a group of experts selected by Emmanuel Macron to help him identify and strive for clear and accessible climate policy goals. Badré is also a member of the advisory board of Project Syndicate.
