= Maurice Adevah-Pœuf =

French politician and academic (1943–2021)

Member of the French National Assembly
- In office 1 June 1997 – 18 June 2002
- Preceded by: Jean-Marc Chartoire
- Succeeded by: André Chassaigne
- Constituency: Puy-de-Dôme's 5th constituency
- In office 21 June 1981 – 1 April 1993
- Preceded by: René Barnérias
- Succeeded by: Jean-Marc Chartoire
- Constituency: Puy-de-Dôme's 5th constituency

Mayor of Thiers
- In office 20 March 1977 – 18 March 2001
- Preceded by: René Barnérias
- Succeeded by: Thierry Déglon

General Councilor of the Canton of Thiers
- In office 25 March 1979 – 29 March 1992
- Preceded by: René Barnérias
- Succeeded by: Jean-Marc Chartoire

Regional Councilor of Auvergne
- In office 1977–1986

President of the Livradois-Forez Regional Natural Park
- In office 1986–1998

President of the Thiers communauté
- In office 1999–2001
- Preceded by: position established
- Succeeded by: Daniel Bertucat

Personal details
- Born: 27 March 1943 Larodde, Puy-de-Dôme, Zone libre, France
- Died: 10 May 2021 (aged 78)
- Party: PS

Maurice Adevah-Pœuf (27 March 1943 – 10 May 2021) was a French politician and academic. A member of the Socialist Party, he served as a member of the National Assembly for Puy-de-Dôme's 5th constituency from 1981 to 1993 and again from 1997 to 2002. He also served as Mayor of Thiers from 1977 to 2001, General Councilor of the Canton of Thiers from 1979 to 1992, Regional Councilor of Auvergne from 1977 to 1986, and Founding President of the Livradois-Forez Regional Natural Park.

== Biography ==
A history and geography teacher and company director,Puy-de-Dôme's 5th constituency was a member of parliament for the 5th constituency of Puy-de-Dôme, France, from 1981 to 1993 and then from 1997 to 2002.

In 1977, the left wing in Thiers, united for the first time in the first round of municipal elections, regained control of the town it had lost six years earlier. Maurice Adevah-Pœuf, second on the list led by Gilles Gauthier, was elected mayor. He faced René Barnérias again in the 1978 legislative elections. Although he came out on top in his town, he had to concede the constituency. The following year, Maurice Adevah-Pœuf took his revenge by being elected Departmental council (France) before the pink wave of 1981 propelled him into the National Assembly and precipitated his rival's political retirement.

Maurice Adevah-Pœuf lost his seats as general councilor (1992) and deputy (1993) to Jean-Marc Chartoire, but managed to win the municipal elections in 1995 with nearly 61% of the vote in the first round and returned to the National Assembly (France) in 1997. He began to withdraw from political life in Thiers in 1998, the year in which he sent Annie Chevaldonné to victory in the cantonal elections. In 2001, he lost by a narrow margin to his former deputy Thierry Déglon, who received the support of the local right wing. In 2002, he gave up his seat to Martine Munoz to represent the Socialist Party in the legislative elections.

He is the person who has served the longest as mayor of Thiers. His actions have focused mainly on developing tourism in the city; his record is quite favorable during his last term as mayor, since Thiers has never welcomed as many tourists as it did in the 1990s. He and his running mates were behind the creation and development of the cutlery museum, the Creux de l'Enfer contemporary art center, the Vallée des Rouets, and the reorganization of the Thiers tourist office. Great attention was paid to preserving the town's heritage with the renovation of the two Romanesque churches in Thiers, the Château du Pirou, and numerous half-timbered houses in the medieval center. The ship featured on the town's coat of arms is highlighted on the municipal logo.
