= Saint-Amant-Roche-Savine =

- Commune
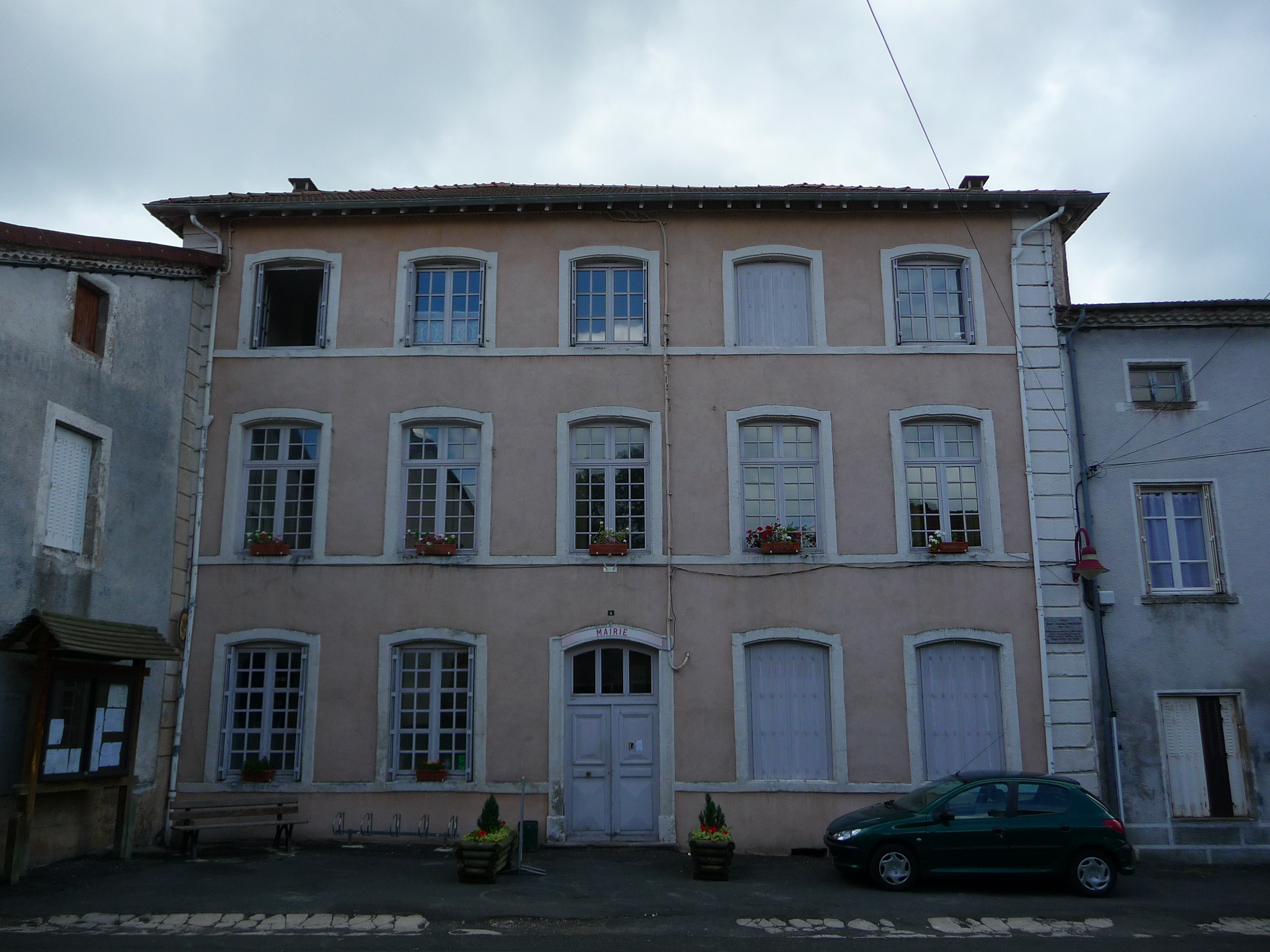
- The town hall in Saint-Amant-Roche-Savine
- Location of Saint-Amant-Roche-Savine
- Location within France Location within Auvergne-Rhône-Alpes
- Coordinates: 45°34′34″N 3°37′59″E
- Country: France
- Region: Auvergne-Rhône-Alpes
- Department: Puy-de-Dôme
- Arrondissement: Ambert
- Canton: Les Monts du Livradois

Government
  - Mayor (2020–2026): Serge Joubert
- Area^{1}: 23.99 km^{2} (9.26 sq mi)
- Elevation: 865 m (2,838 ft)
- Highest elevation: 1,118 m (3,668 ft)
- Lowest elevation: 756 m (2,480 ft)
- Population (2023): 534
  - Density: 22.3/km^{2} (57.7/sq mi)
- Time zone: UTC+01:00 (CET)
  - Summer (DST): UTC+02:00 (CEST)
- INSEE/Postal code: 63314 /63890
- ^{1} French Land Register data, which excludes lakes, ponds, glaciers > 1 km^{2} (0.386 sq mi or 247 acres) and river estuaries.

Saint-Amant-Roche-Savine (French pronunciation: [sɛ̃.t‿amɑ̃ ʁɔʃ savin]) is a commune in the Puy-de-Dôme department in Auvergne in central France. The nearest city is Ambert.

== See also ==
- Communes of the Puy-de-Dôme department
