= André Gattolin =

French docent and politician

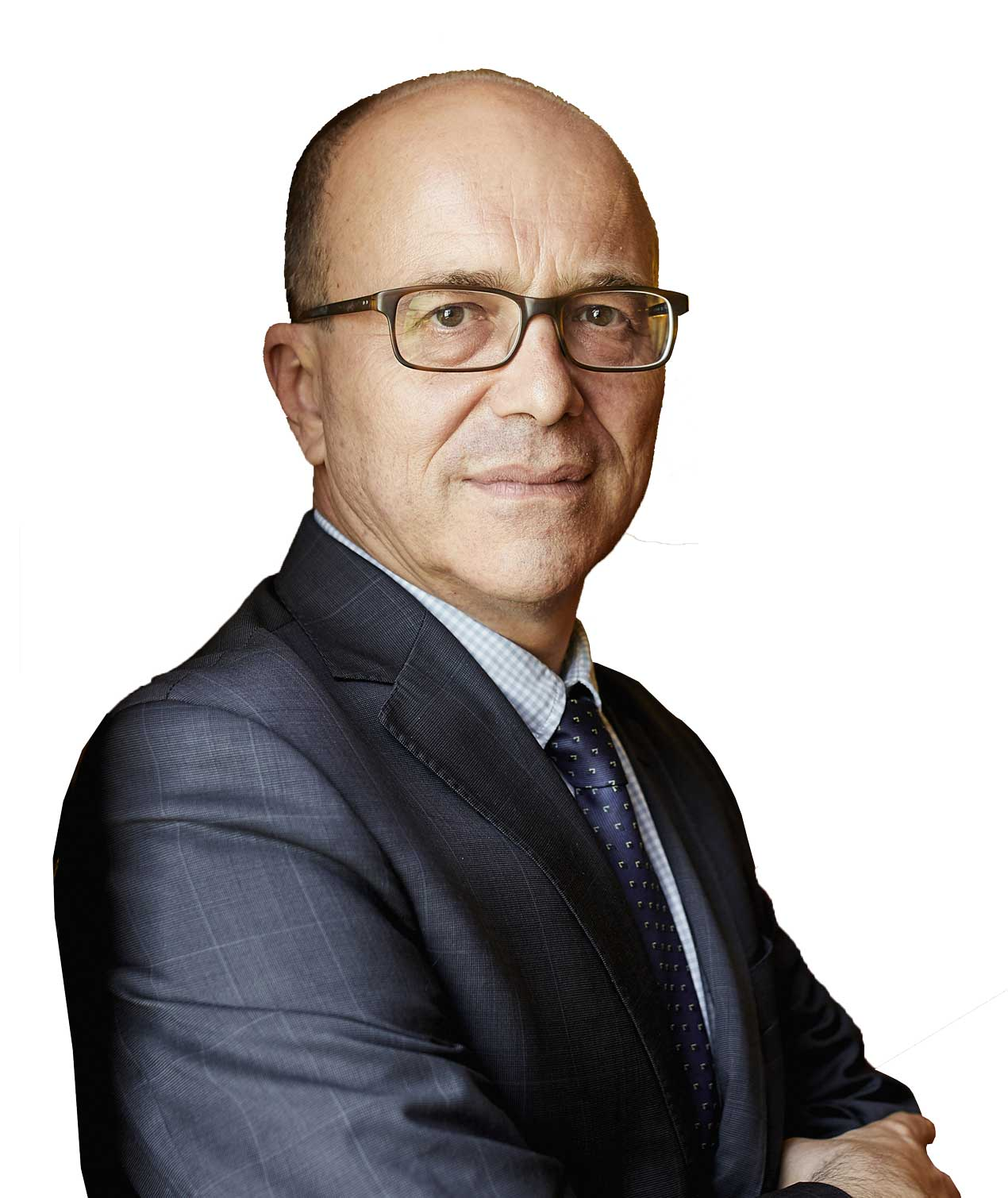

Member of the French Senate
- In office 1 October 2011 – 2 October 2023
- Election: 2011 French Senate election
- Re-election: 2017 French Senate election
- Parliamentary group: ECO (2011-2017); LREM (2017-2020); RDPI (2020-2023)
- Constituency: Hauts-de-Seine

Personal details
- Born: 24 June 1960 (age 66) Bourgoin-Jallieu, France
- Party: Europe Ecology – The Greens (2009-2017); La République En Marche! (since 2017)
- Education: Sciences Po

André Gattolin (born 24 June 1960) is a French ecologist politician and Senator for Hauts-de-Seine from 2011 to 2023.

== Biography ==
Born on 24 June 1960, he studied at Sciences-Po Paris and University of Paris III: Sorbonne Nouvelle. From 1996, he becomes marketing director of the French newspaper Libération. Since 2006, he has been teaching Communication Sciences at University of Paris III: Sorbonne Nouvelle.

== Political career ==
=== Electoral mandates ===
- Senator of Hauts-de-Seine : Elected in 2011, re-elected in 2017.

==== Senatorial functions ====
- Vice-chair of the European Affairs Committee (since 2014)
- Member of the Culture Committee (since 2017)
- Vice-chair of the Finance Committee (2014-2017)

=== Political functions ===
- Federal secretary of the Transnational Radical Party (1989)
- Délégué national adjoint of Europe Ecology – The Greens (2009-2011)
