= Waldeck L'Huillier =

French politician

- Born: 27 May 1905; Chauvigny, France
- Died: 4 February 1986 (aged 80); Paris, France
- Education: École Spéciale des Travaux Publics; Conservatoire national des arts et métiers
- Occupation: Politician
- Political party: Communist Party

Waldeck L'Huillier (1905-1986) was a French politician. He served as a Communist member of the Senate in the 1950s and of the National Assembly from the early 1950s to the end of the 1970s.

== Biography ==
=== Early life ===
Waldeck L'Huillier was born on 27 May 1905 in Chauvigny, Vienne, France. He is a graduate of the Conservatoire national des arts et métiers.

=== Career ===
He joined the French Communist Party at the age of sixteen. He was jailed for two years for his activism. He later served as the leader of the party.

He served as Deputy Mayor of Gennevilliers from 1934 to 1938. During World War II, he joined the French resistance. He then served as the mayor of Gennevilliers from 1945 to 1973.

He served as a member of the Senate for the Seine district from 1952 to 1958. He also served as a Communist member of the National Assembly for the Seine district from 10 November 1946 to 4 July 1951 and for the Paris district from 25 November 1962 to 2 April 1967. He then served as a member of the Assembly for the Hauts-de-Seine district from 5 March 1967 to 30 May 1968, from 23 June 1968 to 1 April 1973 and again from 4 March 1973 to 2 April 1978.

=== Death ===
He died on 4 February 1986 in Paris.
