= Denis Badré =

French politician

Mayor of Ville-d'Avray
- Incumbent
- Assumed office 25 June 1995

Member of the French Senate for Hauts-de-Seine
- In office 1995–2011

Personal details
- Born: 3 January 1943 (age 83) Pontarlier, France
- Party: MoDem
- Education: École Polytechnique

Denis Badré (born 3 January 1943 in Pontarlier, Doubs) is a member of the Senate of France, representing the Hauts-de-Seine department. He is a member of the MoDem. He is the father of Bertrand Badré.

== Biography ==
Denis Badré is the son of Louis Badré (1907–2001), a senior engineer in the French Water and Forestry Department, and Thérèze Zeller (1907–2000). He has three sisters and one brother, Michel Badré (born in 1948), who is also a senior engineer in the French Water and Forestry Department.
