= List of French departments by life expectancy =

Development of life expectancy in France from 1816 to 2024

Metropolitan France is administratively divided into 13 regions. The regions are in turn divided into departments, of which there are 96 in total. In addition, France includes a number of overseas territories, 5 of which have a status equal to departments and regions in the metropolitan area.

According to estimation of the United Nations, in 2023 life expectancy in France was 83.33 years (80.43 for male, 86.09 for female).

Estimation of the World Bank Group for 2023: 82.93 years total (80.10 for male, 85.90 for female).

Estimation of Eurostat for 2023: 83.0 years total (80.1 for male, 85.7 for female).

According to estimation of the WHO for 2019, at that year life expectancy in France was 82.53 years (79.77 years for male and 85.15 years for female).
And healthy life expectancy was 70.72 years (69.78 years for male and 71.60 years for female).

Life expectancy in France as of 2023 is lower than in neighboring Spain, Italy and Switzerland. However, it is higher than in Belgium, the Netherlands, Germany, and the United Kingdom.

== INSEE (2015—2025) ==
The official statistics of France, available on the INSEE website, do not include total life expectancy for the population as a whole. For a more correct comparison of regions with various differences in life expectancy for men and women, a column with the arithmetic mean of these indicators was added to the tables.INSEE has been publishing on its website tabular data on life expectancy in regions and departments since 2015. By default tables are sorted by arithmetic mean for 2025.

=== Statistics by region ===
==== Metropolitan France ====
region	2015				2015 →2019	2019				2019 →2024	2024				2024 →2025	2025				2015 →2025
region	male	female	sex gap	arith. mean	2015 →2019	male	female	sex gap	arith. mean	2019 →2024	male	female	sex gap	arith. mean	2024 →2025	male	female	sex gap	arith. mean	2015 →2025
Metropolitan France	79.0	85.1	6.1	82.05	0.70	79.8	85.7	5.9	82.75	0.15	80.1	85.7	5.6	82.90	0.25	80.4	85.9	5.5	83.15	1.10
Île-de-France (Paris Region)	80.6	85.6	5.0	83.10	0.65	81.4	86.1	4.7	83.75	0.25	81.7	86.3	4.6	84.00	0.25	82.0	86.5	4.5	84.25	1.15
Corsica	79.6	85.6	6.0	82.60	0.85	80.5	86.4	5.9	83.45	0.25	81.6	85.8	4.2	83.70	0.25	81.6	86.3	4.7	83.95	1.35
Auvergne-Rhône-Alpes	79.9	85.5	5.6	82.70	0.50	80.5	85.9	5.4	83.20	0.35	81.0	86.1	5.1	83.55	0.10	81.1	86.2	5.1	83.65	0.95
Provence-Alpes-Côte d'Azur	79.4	85.3	5.9	82.35	0.45	80.0	85.6	5.6	82.80	0.55	80.7	86.0	5.3	83.35	0.10	80.8	86.1	5.3	83.45	1.10
Pays de la Loire	79.1	85.6	6.5	82.35	0.55	79.8	86.0	6.2	82.90	0.20	80.2	86.0	5.8	83.10	0.15	80.4	86.1	5.7	83.25	0.90
Occitania	79.6	85.4	5.8	82.50	0.30	80.1	85.5	5.4	82.80	0.20	80.3	85.7	5.4	83.00	0.20	80.6	85.8	5.2	83.20	0.70
Nouvelle-Aquitaine	79.2	85.3	6.1	82.25	0.35	79.7	85.5	5.8	82.60	0.05	79.9	85.4	5.5	82.65	0.40	80.3	85.8	5.5	83.05	0.80
Centre-Val de Loire	78.9	85.0	6.1	81.95	0.30	79.3	85.2	5.9	82.25	0.05	79.4	85.2	5.8	82.30	0.20	79.9	85.1	5.2	82.50	0.55
Brittany	78.2	84.9	6.7	81.55	0.40	78.7	85.2	6.5	81.95	0.35	79.4	85.2	5.8	82.30	0.15	79.6	85.3	5.7	82.45	0.90
Bourgogne-Franche-Comté	78.5	84.9	6.4	81.70	0.25	78.9	85.0	6.1	81.95	0.10	79.1	85.0	5.9	82.05	0.10	79.0	85.3	6.3	82.15	0.45
Grand Est	78.6	84.2	5.6	81.40	0.40	79.0	84.6	5.6	81.80	0.15	79.2	84.7	5.5	81.95	0.05	79.4	84.6	5.2	82.00	0.60
Normandy	77.8	84.6	6.8	81.20	0.40	78.3	84.9	6.6	81.60	0.15	78.8	84.7	5.9	81.75	0.20	78.9	85.0	6.1	81.95	0.75
Hauts-de-France	76.7	83.4	6.7	80.05	0.60	77.5	83.8	6.3	80.65	0.45	78.1	84.1	6.0	81.10	0.15	78.4	84.1	5.7	81.25	1.20

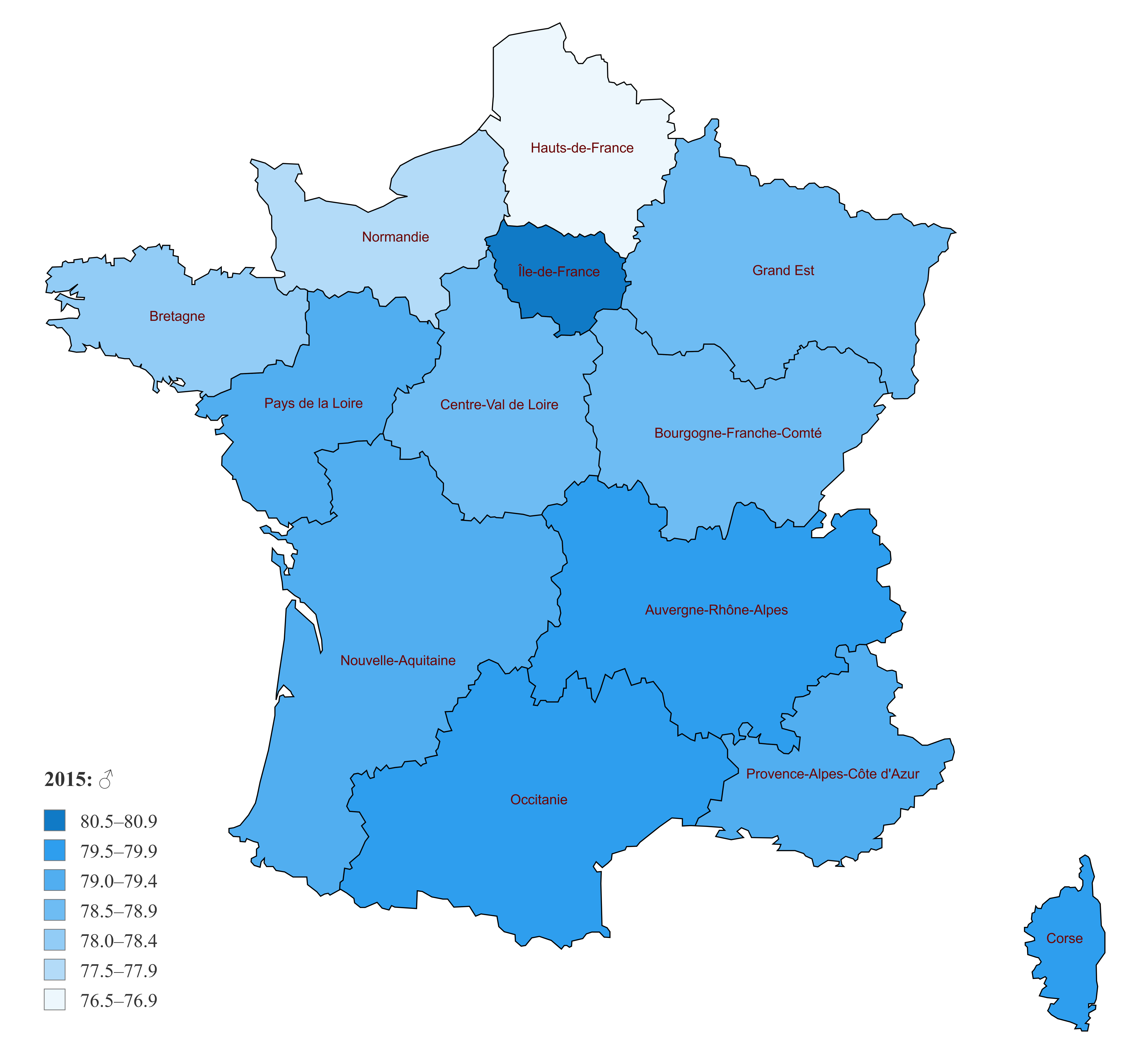
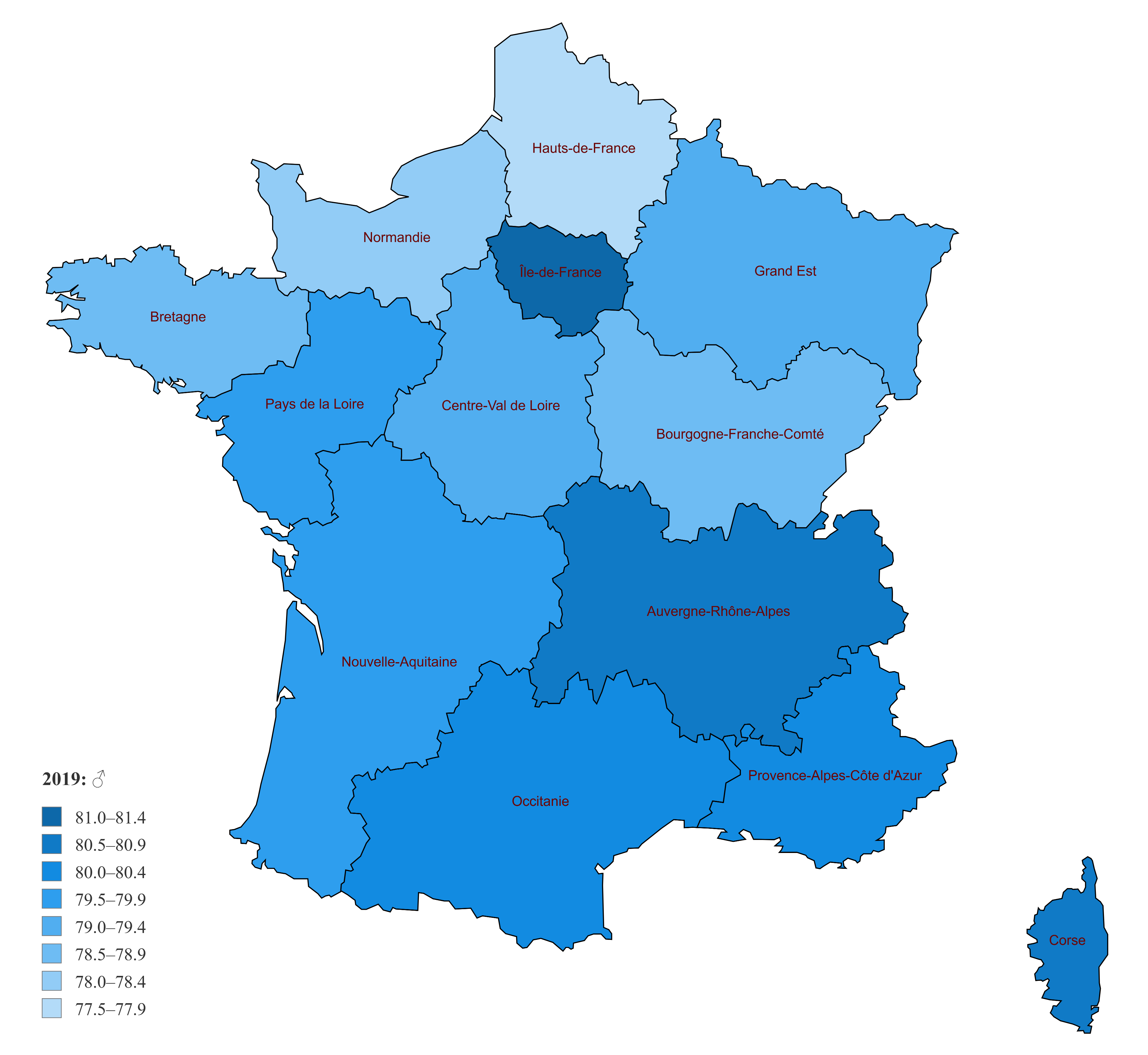
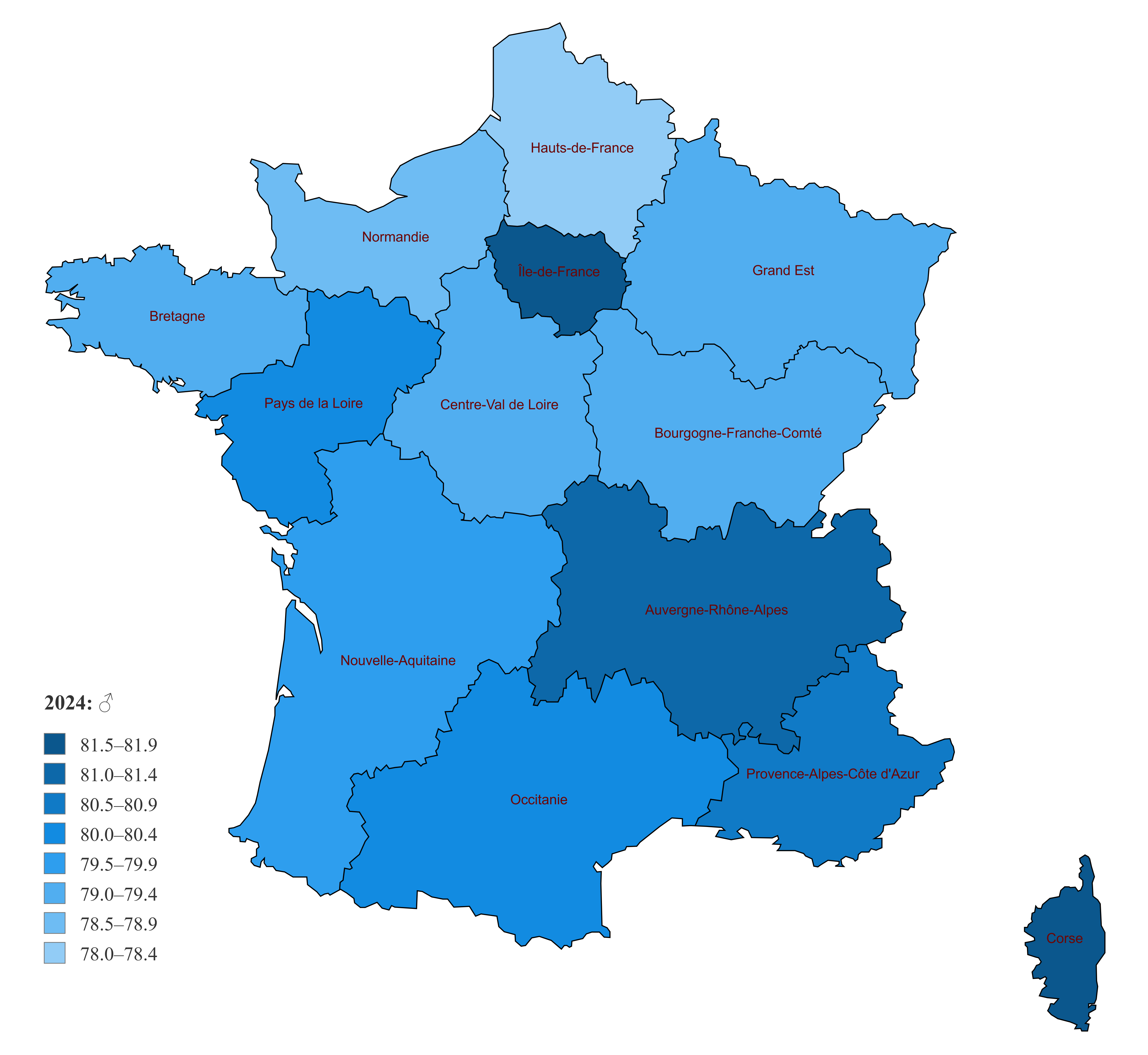
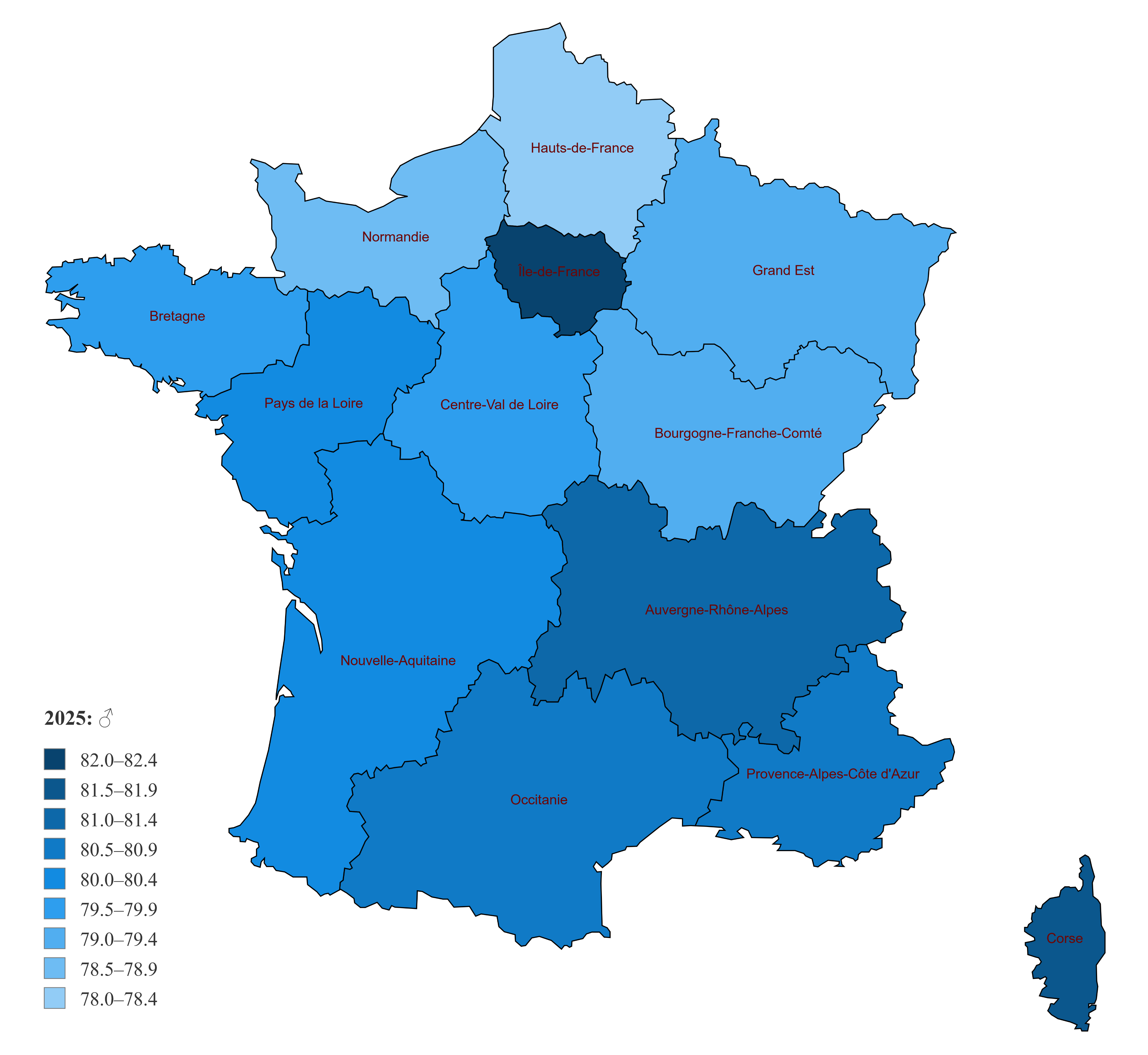
Life expectancy for male in the regions of metropolitan France in 2015, 2019, 2024 and 2025
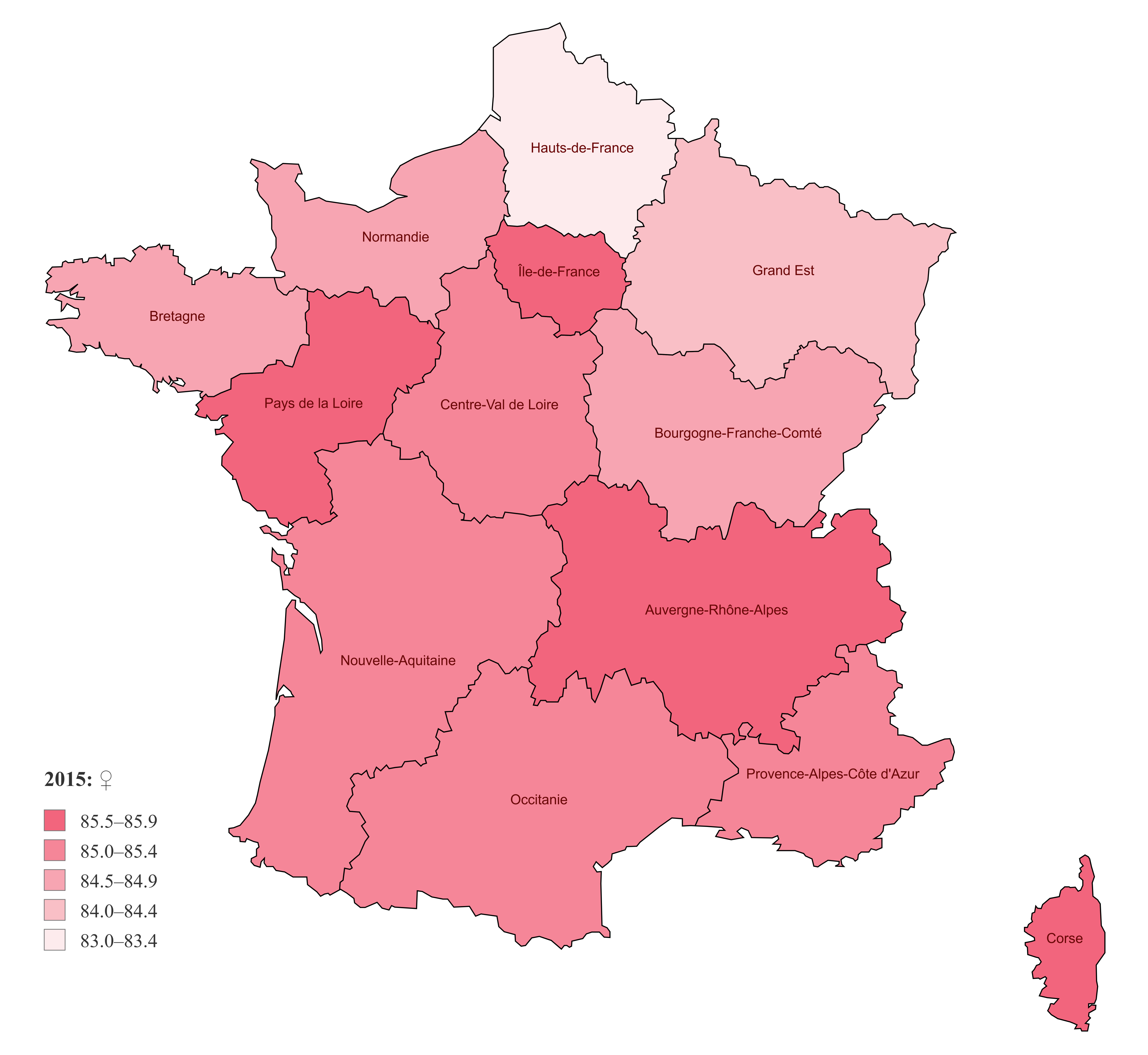
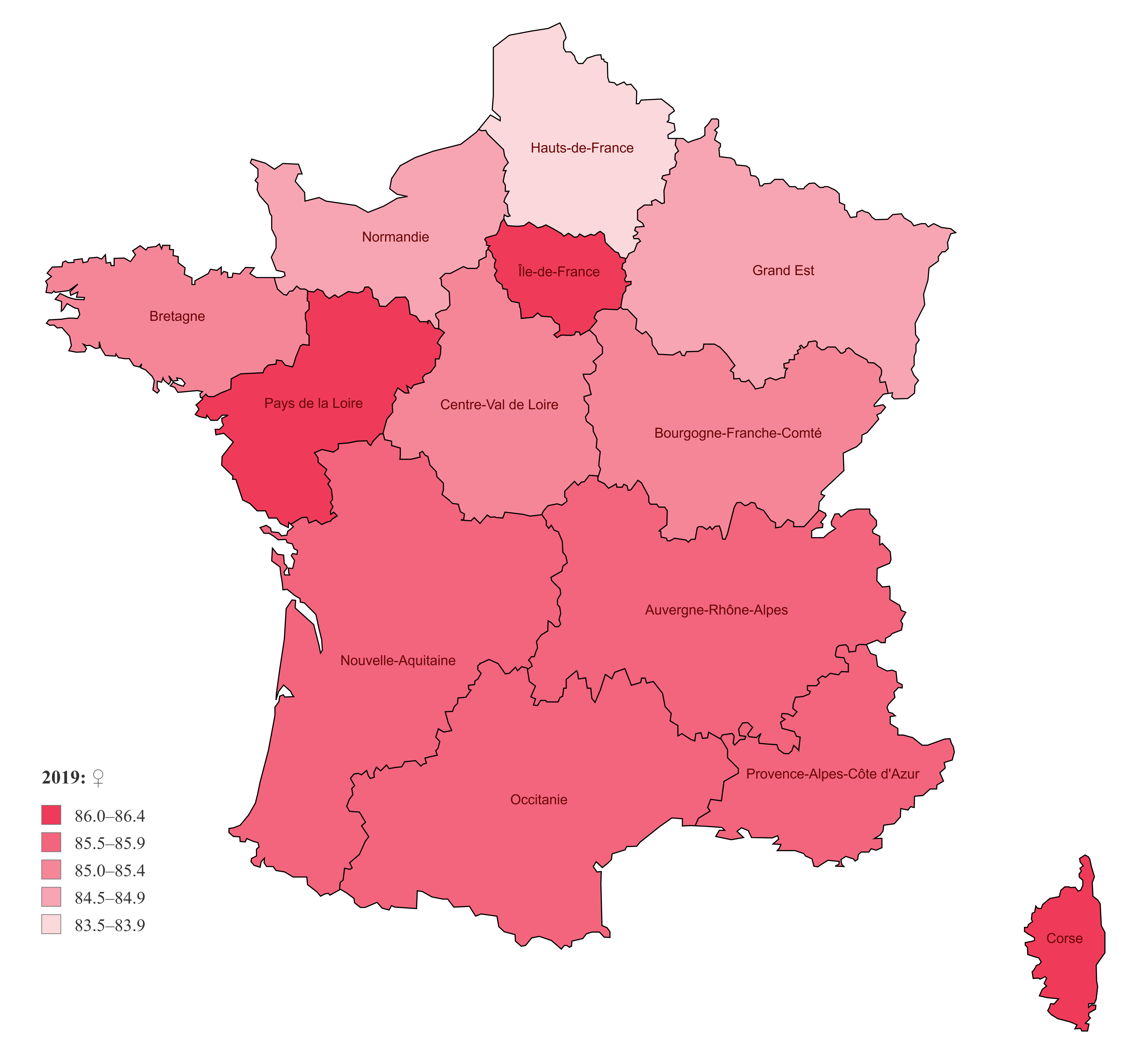
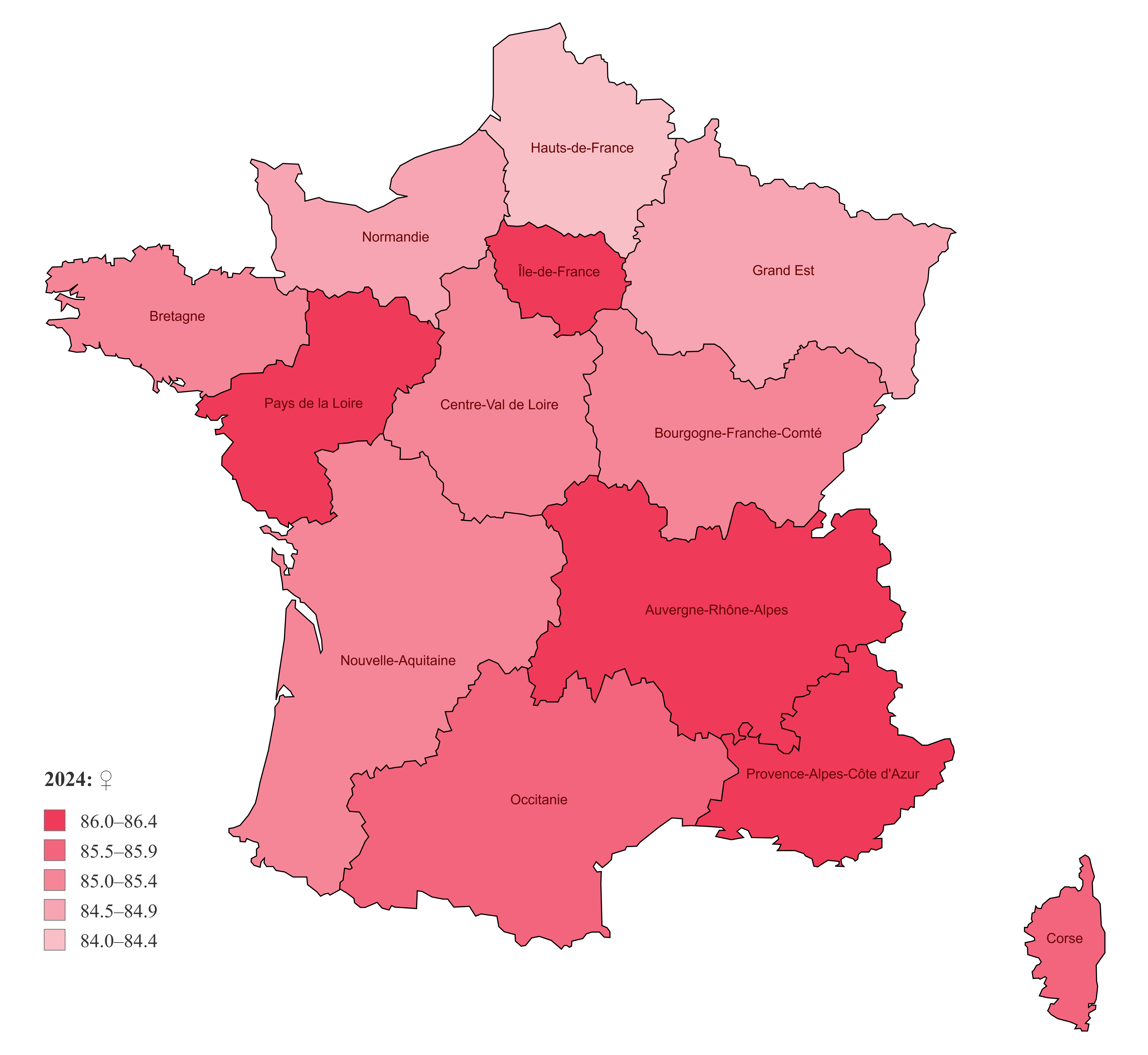
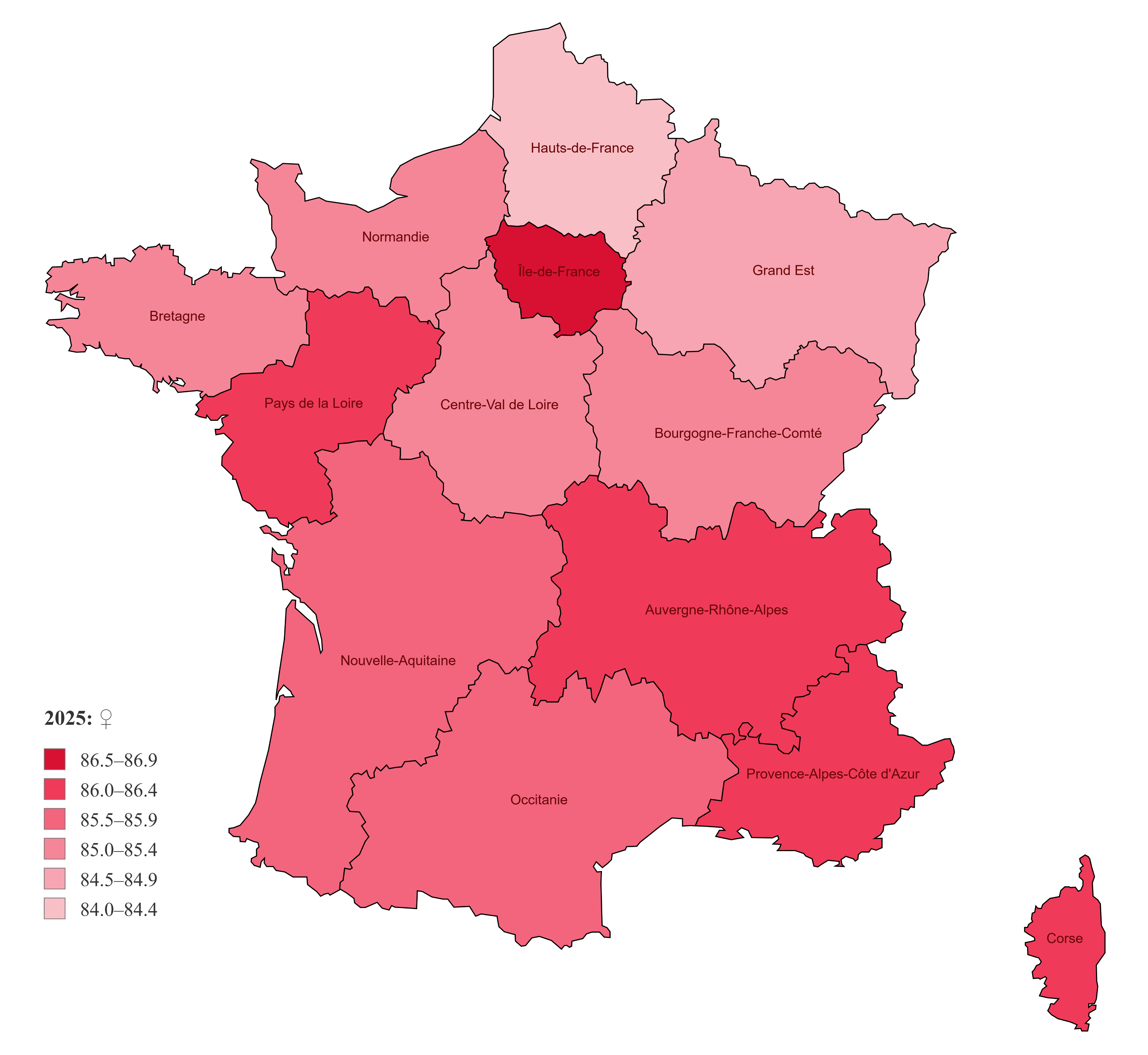
Life expectancy for female in the regions of metropolitan France in 2015, 2019, 2024 and 2025

==== Overseas regions ====
region	2015				2015 →2019	2019				2019 →2024	2024				2024 →2025	2025				2015 →2025
region	male	female	sex gap	arith. mean	2015 →2019	male	female	sex gap	arith. mean	2019 →2024	male	female	sex gap	arith. mean	2024 →2025	male	female	sex gap	arith. mean	2015 →2025
France on average	79.0	85.1	6.1	82.05	0.60	79.7	85.6	5.9	82.65	0.15	80.0	85.6	5.6	82.80	0.30	80.3	85.9	5.6	83.10	1.05
Guadeloupe (in the Caribbean)	77.0	84.8	7.8	80.90	−0.35	76.4	84.7	8.3	80.55	−0.90	76.0	83.3	7.3	79.65	1.75	78.1	84.7	6.6	81.40	0.50
Réunion (in the Indian Ocean)	77.1	83.6	6.5	80.35	1.25	78.5	84.7	6.2	81.60	−0.30	78.5	84.1	5.6	81.30	0.05	78.2	84.5	6.3	81.35	1.00
Martinique (in the Caribbean)	79.4	84.7	5.3	82.05	−0.50	78.8	84.3	5.5	81.55	−0.30	78.4	84.1	5.7	81.25	0.05	77.5	85.1	7.6	81.30	−0.75
French Guiana (in South America)	76.4	82.0	5.6	79.20	1.00	76.6	83.8	7.2	80.20	−1.25	76.1	81.8	5.7	78.95	0.70	77.1	82.2	5.1	79.65	0.45
Mayotte (in the Indian Ocean)	75.3	77.2	1.9	76.25	—	—	—	—	—	—	72.8	75.8	3.0	74.30	0.40	73.0	76.4	3.4	74.70	−1.55

Data source: INSEE

=== Statistics by department ===
code	department	2015				2015 →2019	2019				2019 →2024	2024				2024 →2025	2025				2015 →2025
code	department	male	female	sex gap	arith. mean	2015 →2019	male	female	sex gap	arith. mean	2019 →2024	male	female	sex gap	arith. mean	2024 →2025	male	female	sex gap	arith. mean	2015 →2025
M	Metropolitan France	79.0	85.1	6.1	82.05	0.70	79.8	85.7	5.9	82.75	0.15	80.1	85.7	5.6	82.90	0.25	80.4	85.9	5.5	83.15	1.10
92	Hauts-de-Seine	81.5	86.2	4.7	83.85	0.70	82.6	86.5	3.9	84.55	0.35	82.7	87.1	4.4	84.90	0.50	83.2	87.6	4.4	85.40	1.55
94	Val-de-Marne	80.8	85.5	4.7	83.15	0.65	81.4	86.2	4.8	83.80	0.75	82.4	86.7	4.3	84.55	0.20	82.8	86.7	3.9	84.75	1.60
75	Paris	81.2	86.4	5.2	83.80	0.65	82.0	86.9	4.9	84.45	−0.10	82.0	86.7	4.7	84.35	0.40	82.4	87.1	4.7	84.75	0.95
2A	Corse-du-Sud	79.7	85.2	5.5	82.45	1.15	80.8	86.4	5.6	83.60	0.60	82.4	86.0	3.6	84.20	0.45	82.1	87.2	5.1	84.65	2.20
78	Yvelines	81.4	86.2	4.8	83.80	0.45	81.9	86.6	4.7	84.25	0.10	82.1	86.6	4.5	84.35	0.20	82.3	86.8	4.5	84.55	0.75
69	Rhône, Lyon Metropolis	80.3	85.9	5.6	83.10	0.85	81.3	86.6	5.3	83.95	0.70	82.2	87.1	4.9	84.65	−0.15	81.9	87.1	5.2	84.50	1.40
91	Essonne	80.7	85.8	5.1	83.25	0.60	81.5	86.2	4.7	83.85	0.05	81.6	86.2	4.6	83.90	0.40	82.2	86.4	4.2	84.30	1.05
31	Haute-Garonne	81.0	86.1	5.1	83.55	0.20	81.5	86.0	4.5	83.75	0.50	82.0	86.5	4.5	84.25	0.00	82.1	86.4	4.3	84.25	0.70
74	Haute-Savoie	80.7	85.9	5.2	83.30	0.55	81.4	86.3	4.9	83.85	0.40	81.8	86.7	4.9	84.25	−0.05	81.8	86.6	4.8	84.20	0.90
38	Isère	80.5	85.9	5.4	83.20	0.35	81.2	85.9	4.7	83.55	0.45	81.8	86.2	4.4	84.00	0.20	81.6	86.8	5.2	84.20	1.00
81	Tarn	79.8	86.1	6.3	82.95	−0.15	79.8	85.8	6.0	82.80	0.85	81.3	86.0	4.7	83.65	0.40	81.6	86.5	4.9	84.05	1.10
01	Ain	80.4	85.5	5.1	82.95	0.50	80.9	86.0	5.1	83.45	0.25	81.4	86.0	4.6	83.70	0.25	82.0	85.9	3.9	83.95	1.00
73	Savoie	80.0	85.5	5.5	82.75	0.75	80.5	86.5	6.0	83.50	0.35	81.0	86.7	5.7	83.85	0.05	81.2	86.6	5.4	83.90	1.15
64	Pyrénées-Atlantiques	79.8	85.6	5.8	82.70	0.65	80.6	86.1	5.5	83.35	0.30	81.1	86.2	5.1	83.65	0.20	81.3	86.4	5.1	83.85	1.15
33	Gironde	79.6	85.5	5.9	82.55	0.55	80.4	85.8	5.4	83.10	0.15	80.6	85.9	5.3	83.25	0.60	81.3	86.4	5.1	83.85	1.30
06	Alpes-Maritimes	79.6	85.7	6.1	82.65	0.50	80.5	85.8	5.3	83.15	0.30	80.7	86.2	5.5	83.45	0.35	81.1	86.5	5.4	83.80	1.15
49	Maine-et-Loire	79.8	85.8	6.0	82.80	1.05	81.0	86.7	5.7	83.85	−0.10	80.8	86.7	5.9	83.75	0.00	81.1	86.4	5.3	83.75	0.95
37	Indre-et-Loire	79.6	85.9	6.3	82.75	0.35	80.0	86.2	6.2	83.10	0.55	80.8	86.5	5.7	83.65	−0.10	81.0	86.1	5.1	83.55	0.80
53	Mayenne	79.6	85.6	6.0	82.60	0.40	79.9	86.1	6.2	83.00	0.30	80.4	86.2	5.8	83.30	0.25	80.6	86.5	5.9	83.55	0.95
95	Val-d'Oise	79.8	84.9	5.1	82.35	0.60	80.5	85.4	4.9	82.95	0.25	81.1	85.3	4.2	83.20	0.30	81.1	85.9	4.8	83.50	1.15
13	Bouches-du-Rhône	79.4	85.1	5.7	82.25	0.60	80.0	85.7	5.7	82.85	0.50	80.8	85.9	5.1	83.35	0.15	81.0	86.0	5.0	83.50	1.25
35	Ille-et-Vilaine	79.7	85.5	5.8	82.60	0.55	80.2	86.1	5.9	83.15	0.45	80.8	86.4	5.6	83.60	−0.15	80.9	86.0	5.1	83.45	0.85
34	Hérault	79.4	85.6	6.2	82.50	0.30	79.9	85.7	5.8	82.80	0.25	80.1	86.0	5.9	83.05	0.40	80.6	86.3	5.7	83.45	0.95
05	Hautes-Alpes	80.1	85.3	5.2	82.70	0.65	80.4	86.3	5.9	83.35	0.15	80.7	86.3	5.6	83.50	−0.10	80.7	86.1	5.4	83.40	0.70
2B	Haute-Corse	79.6	85.9	6.3	82.75	0.55	80.2	86.4	6.2	83.30	−0.05	80.9	85.6	4.7	83.25	0.10	81.2	85.5	4.3	83.35	0.60
93	Seine-Saint-Denis	79.1	84.4	5.3	81.75	0.60	80.0	84.7	4.7	82.35	0.70	80.5	85.6	5.1	83.05	0.30	81.0	85.7	4.7	83.35	1.60
21	Côte-d'Or	79.7	85.4	5.7	82.55	0.35	79.9	85.9	6.0	82.90	0.05	80.2	85.7	5.5	82.95	0.30	80.4	86.1	5.7	83.25	0.70
44	Loire-Atlantique	78.6	85.7	7.1	82.15	0.50	79.5	85.8	6.3	82.65	0.30	80.1	85.8	5.7	82.95	0.30	80.3	86.2	5.9	83.25	1.10
77	Seine-et-Marne	79.3	84.7	5.4	82.00	0.95	80.4	85.5	5.1	82.95	0.10	80.6	85.5	4.9	83.05	0.15	81.0	85.4	4.4	83.20	1.20
42	Loire	79.7	85.4	5.7	82.55	0.35	80.3	85.5	5.2	82.90	0.05	80.2	85.7	5.5	82.95	0.25	80.8	85.6	4.8	83.20	0.65
32	Gers	80.5	84.3	3.8	82.40	0.10	79.4	85.6	6.2	82.50	0.20	80.1	85.3	5.2	82.70	0.45	80.8	85.5	4.7	83.15	0.75
26	Drôme	79.7	85.7	6.0	82.70	−0.10	79.6	85.6	6.0	82.60	0.35	80.3	85.6	5.3	82.95	0.20	80.6	85.7	5.1	83.15	0.45
30	Gard	78.9	85.1	6.2	82.00	0.45	79.6	85.3	5.7	82.45	0.10	79.9	85.2	5.3	82.55	0.60	80.6	85.7	5.1	83.15	1.15
83	Var	79.6	85.4	5.8	82.50	0.10	79.7	85.5	5.8	82.60	0.80	80.7	86.1	5.4	83.40	−0.25	80.3	86.0	5.7	83.15	0.65
68	Haut-Rhin	79.5	84.2	4.7	81.85	0.60	80.1	84.8	4.7	82.45	0.05	79.9	85.1	5.2	82.50	0.50	80.5	85.5	5.0	83.00	1.15
84	Vaucluse	78.3	84.7	6.4	81.50	0.65	79.2	85.1	5.9	82.15	1.05	80.3	86.1	5.8	83.20	−0.20	80.3	85.7	5.4	83.00	1.50
65	Hautes-Pyrénées	78.3	85.3	7.0	81.80	0.55	80.1	84.6	4.5	82.35	−0.05	79.5	85.1	5.6	82.30	0.60	80.5	85.3	4.8	82.90	1.10
40	Landes	79.1	85.0	5.9	82.05	0.60	79.9	85.4	5.5	82.65	0.25	80.3	85.5	5.2	82.90	0.00	80.3	85.5	5.2	82.90	0.85
19	Corrèze	78.5	84.9	6.4	81.70	0.10	78.7	84.9	6.2	81.80	0.65	80.1	84.8	4.7	82.45	0.45	80.2	85.6	5.4	82.90	1.20
72	Sarthe	78.8	85.1	6.3	81.95	0.35	79.2	85.4	6.2	82.30	0.30	79.8	85.4	5.6	82.60	0.30	79.9	85.9	6.0	82.90	0.95
41	Loir-et-Cher	79.6	85.1	5.5	82.35	−0.20	79.3	85.0	5.7	82.15	0.15	79.2	85.4	6.2	82.30	0.55	80.5	85.2	4.7	82.85	0.50
45	Loiret	78.9	84.7	5.8	81.80	0.85	79.9	85.4	5.5	82.65	−0.05	80.0	85.2	5.2	82.60	0.25	80.3	85.4	5.1	82.85	1.05
85	Vendée	79.2	85.6	6.4	82.40	0.15	79.4	85.7	6.3	82.55	0.15	79.7	85.7	6.0	82.70	0.15	80.2	85.5	5.3	82.85	0.45
43	Haute-Loire	78.5	84.5	6.0	81.50	0.90	79.2	85.6	6.4	82.40	−0.15	79.2	85.3	6.1	82.25	0.60	80.0	85.7	5.7	82.85	1.35
46	Lot	79.3	84.4	5.1	81.85	0.50	79.4	85.3	5.9	82.35	0.40	79.8	85.7	5.9	82.75	0.05	80.5	85.1	4.6	82.80	0.95
86	Vienne	80.1	85.7	5.6	82.90	−0.20	79.5	85.9	6.4	82.70	−0.50	79.4	85.0	5.6	82.20	0.60	79.8	85.8	6.0	82.80	−0.10
07	Ardèche	79.1	84.8	5.7	81.95	0.65	79.9	85.3	5.4	82.60	−0.15	79.8	85.1	5.3	82.45	0.35	79.7	85.9	6.2	82.80	0.85
04	Alpes-de-Haute-Provence	78.9	85.3	6.4	82.10	0.05	79.6	84.7	5.1	82.15	0.80	79.9	86.0	6.1	82.95	−0.20	79.7	85.8	6.1	82.75	0.65
48	Lozère	78.9	83.5	4.6	81.20	0.75	78.7	85.2	6.5	81.95	0.25	78.6	85.8	7.2	82.20	0.50	81.2	84.2	3.0	82.70	1.50
47	Lot-et-Garonne	79.0	85.2	6.2	82.10	0.15	79.3	85.2	5.9	82.25	0.15	79.7	85.1	5.4	82.40	0.30	80.1	85.3	5.2	82.70	0.60
63	Puy-de-Dôme	79.1	85.1	6.0	82.10	0.30	79.3	85.5	6.2	82.40	0.05	79.8	85.1	5.3	82.45	0.25	79.8	85.6	5.8	82.70	0.60
82	Tarn-et-Garonne	79.3	85.5	6.2	82.40	0.25	79.8	85.5	5.7	82.65	−0.45	79.3	85.1	5.8	82.20	0.50	79.3	86.1	6.8	82.70	0.30
67	Bas-Rhin	79.3	84.8	5.5	82.05	0.45	79.9	85.1	5.2	82.50	0.25	80.4	85.1	4.7	82.75	−0.10	80.3	85.0	4.7	82.65	0.60
12	Aveyron	80.2	85.5	5.3	82.85	0.25	80.2	86.0	5.8	83.10	−0.15	80.7	85.2	4.5	82.95	−0.40	80.0	85.1	5.1	82.55	−0.30
17	Charente-Maritime	78.2	85.4	7.2	81.80	0.40	79.2	85.2	6.0	82.20	0.30	79.5	85.5	6.0	82.50	0.05	79.6	85.5	5.9	82.55	0.75
25	Doubs	79.1	85.7	6.6	82.40	0.05	79.3	85.6	6.3	82.45	−0.30	79.5	84.8	5.3	82.15	0.40	79.4	85.7	6.3	82.55	0.15
09	Ariège	79.3	84.9	5.6	82.10	−0.25	78.7	85.0	6.3	81.85	−0.30	78.6	84.5	5.9	81.55	0.90	80.0	84.9	4.9	82.45	0.35
24	Dordogne	78.7	84.9	6.2	81.80	0.40	79.4	85.0	5.6	82.20	−0.45	78.7	84.8	6.1	81.75	0.65	79.6	85.2	5.6	82.40	0.60
79	Deux-Sèvres	79.6	85.5	5.9	82.55	0.20	79.6	85.9	6.3	82.75	−0.80	79.4	84.5	5.1	81.95	0.40	79.4	85.3	5.9	82.35	−0.20
16	Charente	78.5	85.2	6.7	81.85	0.10	79.4	84.5	5.1	81.95	0.05	79.1	84.9	5.8	82.00	0.35	79.0	85.7	6.7	82.35	0.50
15	Cantal	78.8	84.2	5.4	81.50	−0.15	78.4	84.3	5.9	81.35	0.75	79.5	84.7	5.2	82.10	0.20	80.2	84.4	4.2	82.30	0.80
56	Morbihan	78.1	84.7	6.6	81.40	0.25	78.1	85.2	7.1	81.65	0.65	79.5	85.1	5.6	82.30	0.00	79.2	85.4	6.2	82.30	0.90
28	Eure-et-Loir	79.1	85.0	5.9	82.05	0.10	79.2	85.1	5.9	82.15	−0.30	78.9	84.8	5.9	81.85	0.40	79.8	84.7	4.9	82.25	0.20
50	Manche	78.1	85.1	7.0	81.60	0.50	78.6	85.6	7.0	82.10	−0.10	78.9	85.1	6.2	82.00	0.25	79.0	85.5	6.5	82.25	0.65
90	Territoire de Belfort	78.7	82.8	4.1	80.75	0.55	78.6	84.0	5.4	81.30	0.25	79.5	83.6	4.1	81.55	0.65	79.4	85.0	5.6	82.20	1.45
71	Saône-et-Loire	78.1	85.1	7.0	81.60	0.45	79.1	85.0	5.9	82.05	0.30	79.4	85.3	5.9	82.35	−0.15	78.9	85.5	6.6	82.20	0.60
14	Calvados	78.1	85.0	6.9	81.55	0.20	78.5	85.0	6.5	81.75	0.25	79.1	84.9	5.8	82.00	0.20	78.9	85.5	6.6	82.20	0.65
66	Pyrénées-Orientales	78.1	84.6	6.5	81.35	0.45	78.7	84.9	6.2	81.80	−0.05	78.6	84.9	6.3	81.75	0.45	78.9	85.5	6.6	82.20	0.85
51	Marne	77.7	84.2	6.5	80.95	0.85	78.8	84.8	6.0	81.80	0.15	79.0	84.9	5.9	81.95	0.20	79.4	84.9	5.5	82.15	1.20
87	Haute-Vienne	78.5	84.7	6.2	81.60	0.65	78.8	85.7	6.9	82.25	−0.20	78.8	85.3	6.5	82.05	0.05	79.8	84.4	4.6	82.10	0.50
61	Orne	78.3	85.1	6.8	81.70	−0.20	78.2	84.8	6.6	81.50	0.10	78.2	85.0	6.8	81.60	0.50	79.6	84.6	5.0	82.10	0.40
60	Oise	78.0	83.9	5.9	80.95	0.70	78.7	84.6	5.9	81.65	0.35	79.5	84.5	5.0	82.00	0.05	79.6	84.5	4.9	82.05	1.10
39	Jura	78.9	84.9	6.0	81.90	0.65	80.0	85.1	5.1	82.55	−0.65	78.9	84.9	6.0	81.90	0.10	78.9	85.1	6.2	82.00	0.10
54	Meurthe-et-Moselle	78.8	84.2	5.4	81.50	0.70	79.3	85.1	5.8	82.20	−0.25	79.4	84.5	5.1	81.95	0.00	79.2	84.7	5.5	81.95	0.45
29	Finistère	77.2	84.4	7.2	80.80	0.70	78.2	84.8	6.6	81.50	0.15	78.7	84.6	5.9	81.65	0.25	79.0	84.8	5.8	81.90	1.10
76	Seine-Maritime	77.3	84.2	6.9	80.75	0.60	78.1	84.6	6.5	81.35	0.25	78.8	84.4	5.6	81.60	0.10	78.7	84.7	6.0	81.70	0.95
27	Eure	77.7	84.4	6.7	81.05	0.40	78.3	84.6	6.3	81.45	0.05	78.4	84.6	6.2	81.50	0.20	78.7	84.7	6.0	81.70	0.65
03	Allier	78.1	84.5	6.4	81.30	−0.15	77.7	84.6	6.9	81.15	1.00	78.8	85.5	6.7	82.15	−0.45	78.6	84.8	6.2	81.70	0.40
59	Nord	76.8	83.2	6.4	80.00	0.70	77.6	83.8	6.2	80.70	0.70	78.4	84.4	6.0	81.40	0.25	78.8	84.5	5.7	81.65	1.65
70	Haute-Saône	78.2	84.5	6.3	81.35	0.20	78.7	84.4	5.7	81.55	−0.15	78.2	84.6	6.4	81.40	0.25	78.6	84.7	6.1	81.65	0.30
22	Côtes-d'Armor	77.7	84.8	7.1	81.25	0.05	78.1	84.5	6.4	81.30	−0.15	78.0	84.3	6.3	81.15	0.50	78.5	84.8	6.3	81.65	0.40
10	Aube	78.6	84.1	5.5	81.35	−0.25	77.6	84.6	7.0	81.10	0.30	78.2	84.6	6.4	81.40	0.15	78.9	84.2	5.3	81.55	0.20
55	Meuse	77.8	84.0	6.2	80.90	0.15	77.7	84.4	6.7	81.05	0.30	78.2	84.5	6.3	81.35	0.20	77.9	85.2	7.3	81.55	0.65
88	Vosges	77.9	84.0	6.1	80.95	0.25	77.9	84.5	6.6	81.20	−0.15	78.1	84.0	5.9	81.05	0.35	78.6	84.2	5.6	81.40	0.45
57	Moselle	78.3	83.7	5.4	81.00	0.40	78.9	83.9	5.0	81.40	0.10	78.7	84.3	5.6	81.50	−0.15	79.1	83.6	4.5	81.35	0.35
11	Aude	78.7	85.2	6.5	81.95	0.30	79.4	85.1	5.7	82.25	−0.60	78.5	84.8	6.3	81.65	−0.30	78.3	84.4	6.1	81.35	−0.60
18	Cher	78.0	84.2	6.2	81.10	−0.45	78.0	83.3	5.3	80.65	0.15	77.7	83.9	6.2	80.80	0.40	78.4	84.0	5.6	81.20	0.10
80	Somme	77.1	83.4	6.3	80.25	0.25	77.3	83.7	6.4	80.50	0.40	77.9	83.9	6.0	80.90	0.25	78.3	84.0	5.7	81.15	0.90
89	Yonne	77.6	84.1	6.5	80.85	−0.15	77.5	83.9	6.4	80.70	0.85	78.4	84.7	6.3	81.55	−0.40	78.1	84.2	6.1	81.15	0.30
08	Ardennes	77.1	84.1	7.0	80.60	0.15	77.8	83.7	5.9	80.75	0.25	78.3	83.7	5.4	81.00	0.15	77.7	84.6	6.9	81.15	0.55
23	Creuse	77.6	84.6	7.0	81.10	0.10	77.3	85.1	7.8	81.20	−0.35	77.4	84.3	6.9	80.85	0.20	77.5	84.6	7.1	81.05	−0.05
52	Haute-Marne	77.8	83.1	5.3	80.45	0.35	77.1	84.5	7.4	80.80	0.00	77.0	84.6	7.6	80.80	−0.10	77.3	84.1	6.8	80.70	0.25
62	Pas-de-Calais	75.8	83.3	7.5	79.55	0.65	76.7	83.7	7.0	80.20	0.10	77.2	83.4	6.2	80.30	0.20	77.5	83.5	6.0	80.50	0.95
58	Nièvre	77.1	84.1	7.0	80.60	−0.10	77.1	83.9	6.8	80.50	0.25	77.1	84.4	7.3	80.75	−0.25	76.9	84.1	7.2	80.50	−0.10
36	Indre	77.3	84.0	6.7	80.65	0.65	77.7	84.9	7.2	81.30	0.05	78.2	84.5	6.3	81.35	−0.90	76.9	84.0	7.1	80.45	−0.20
02	Aisne	76.5	83.2	6.7	79.85	0.30	76.9	83.4	6.5	80.15	0.55	77.7	83.7	6.0	80.70	−0.40	77.4	83.2	5.8	80.30	0.45

The table is compiled only for departments in metropolitan France. Data source: INSEE

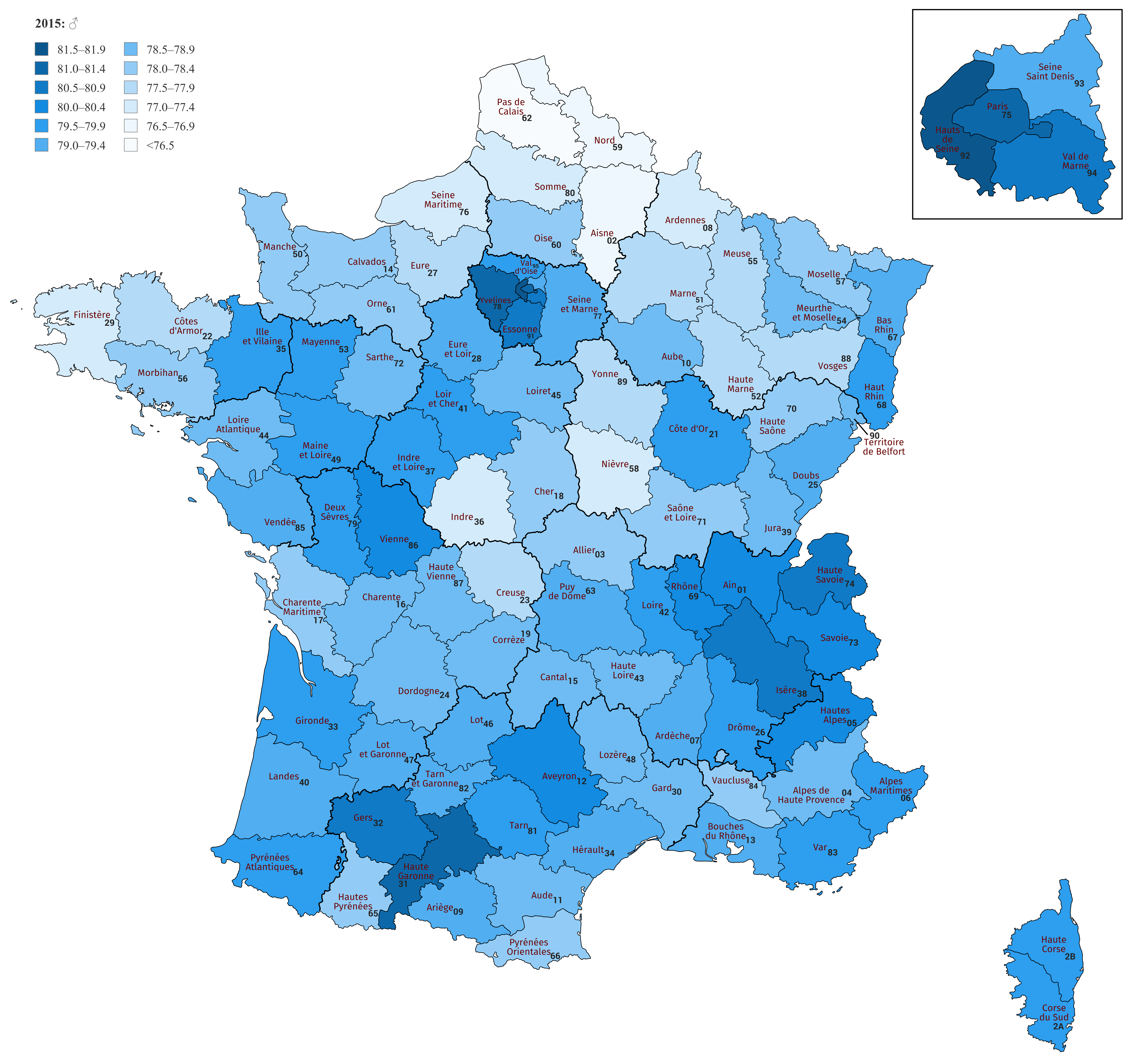
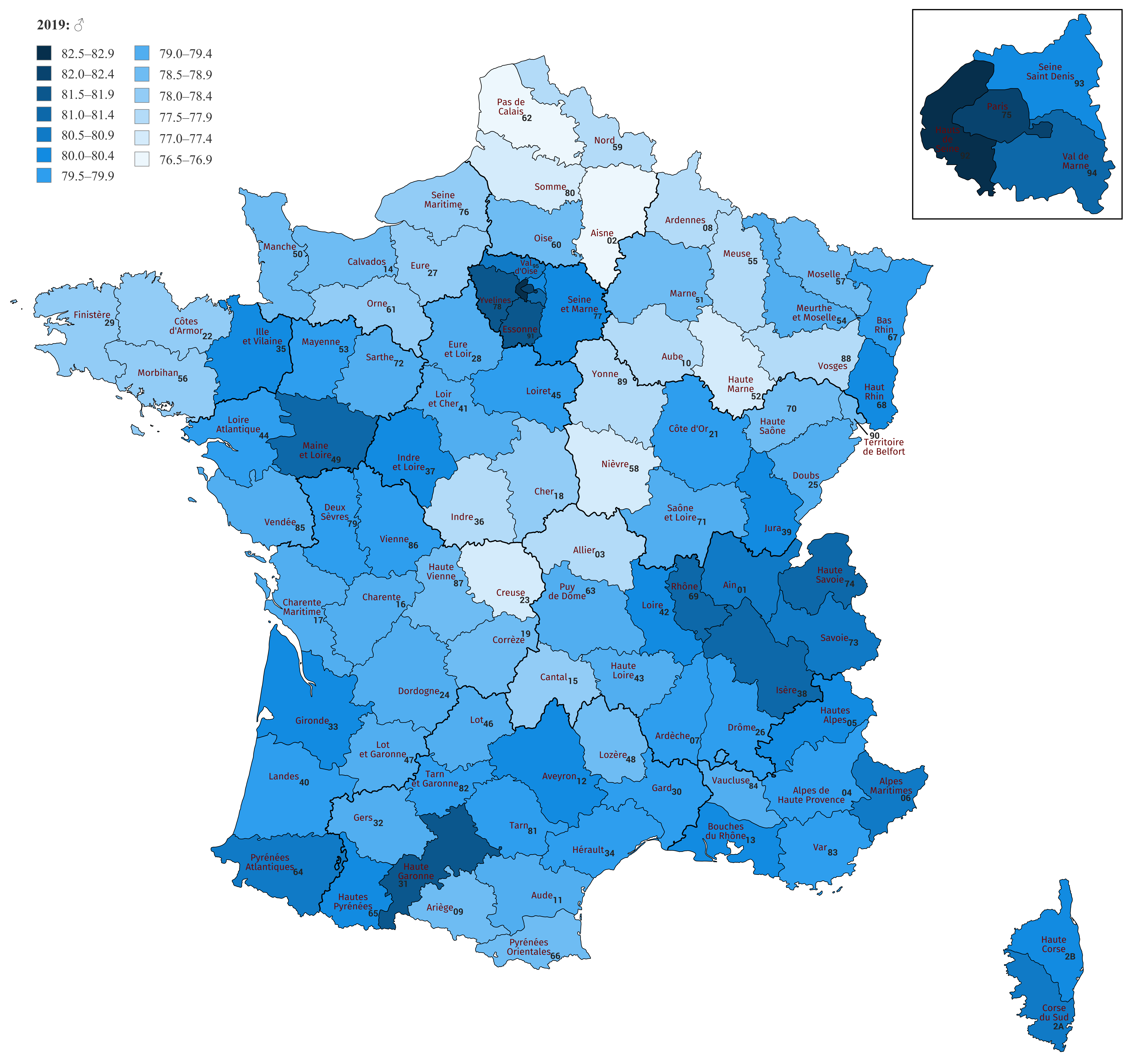
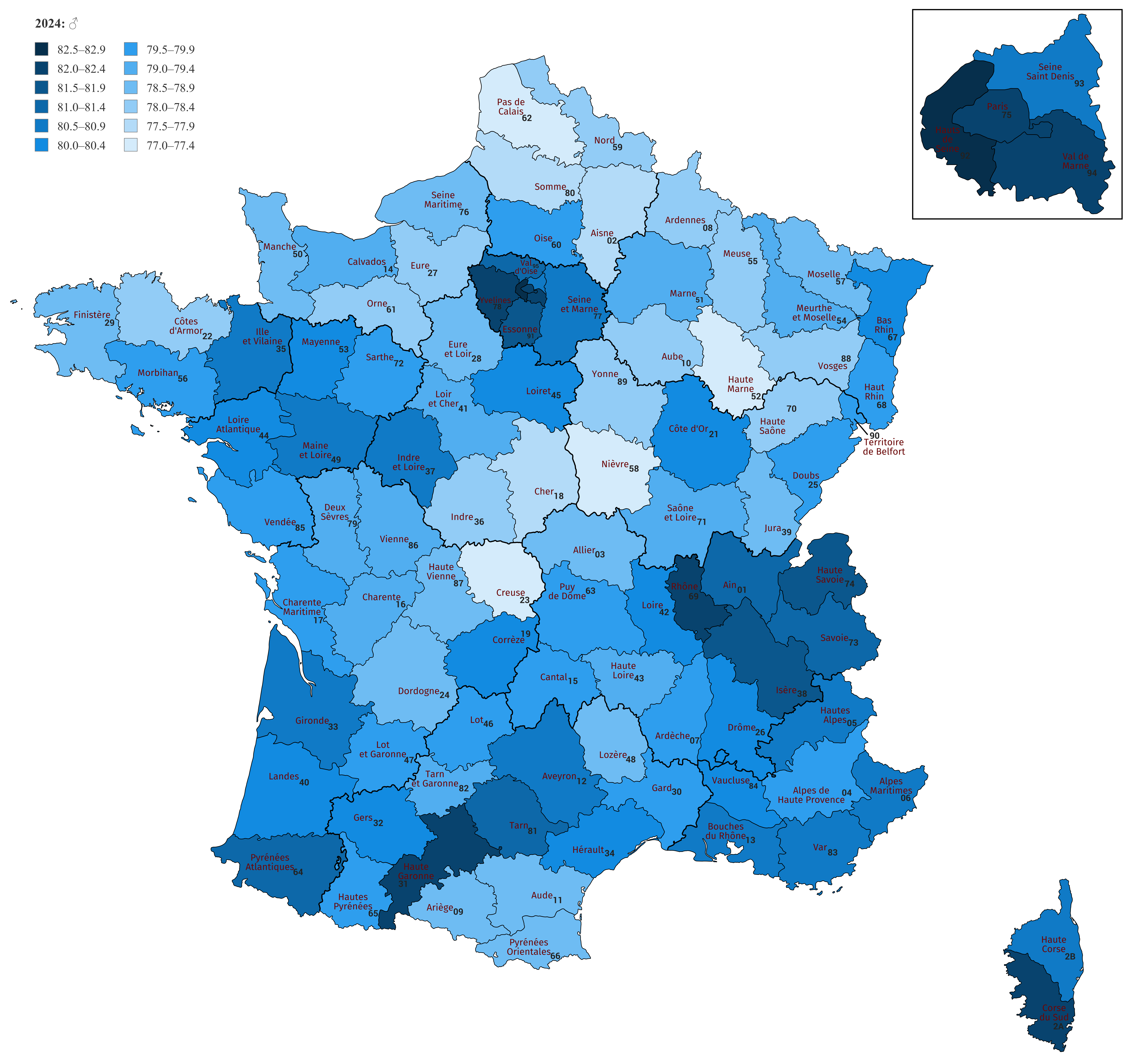
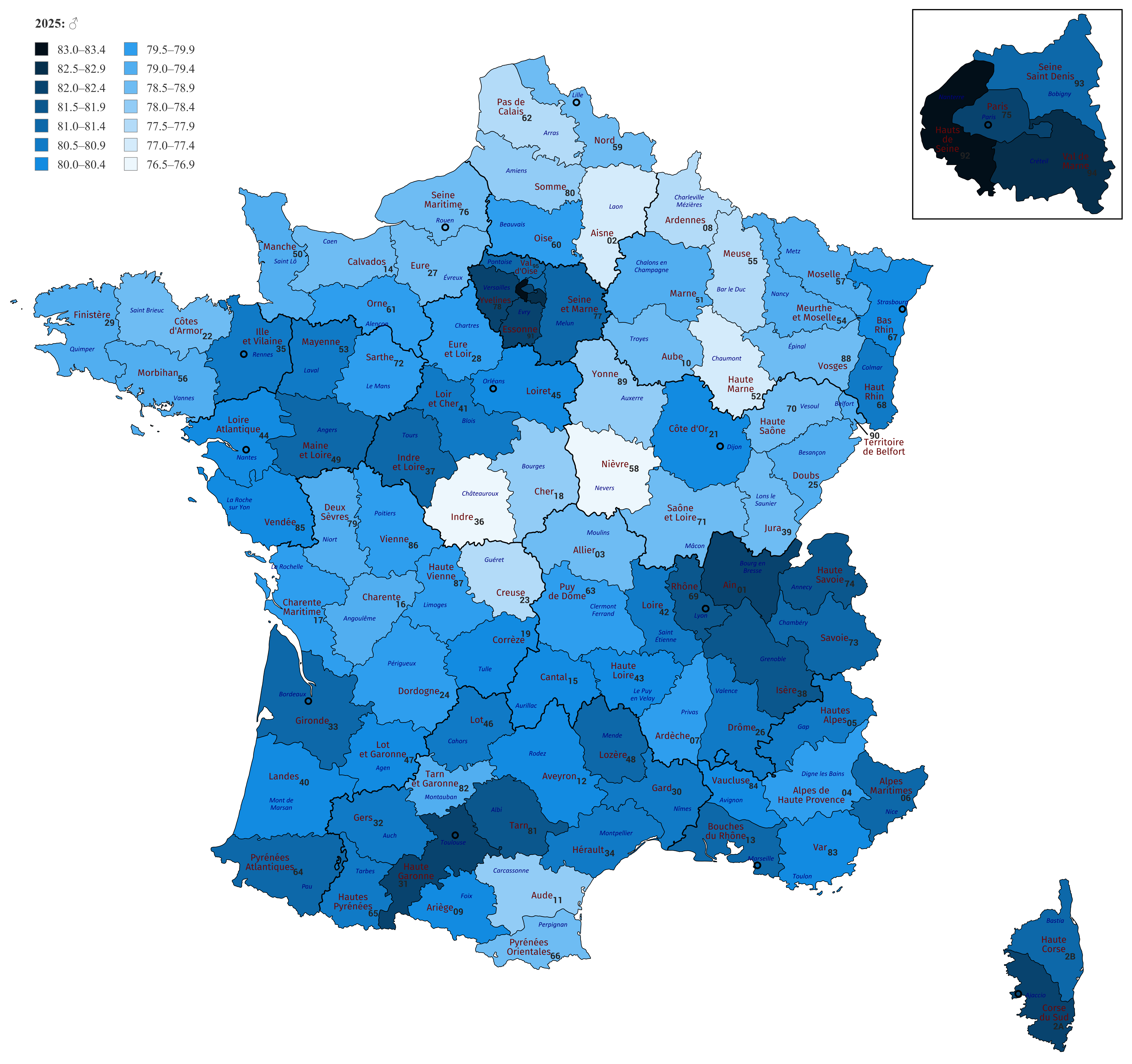
Life expectancy for male in the departments of metropolitan France in 2015, 2019, 2024 and 2025
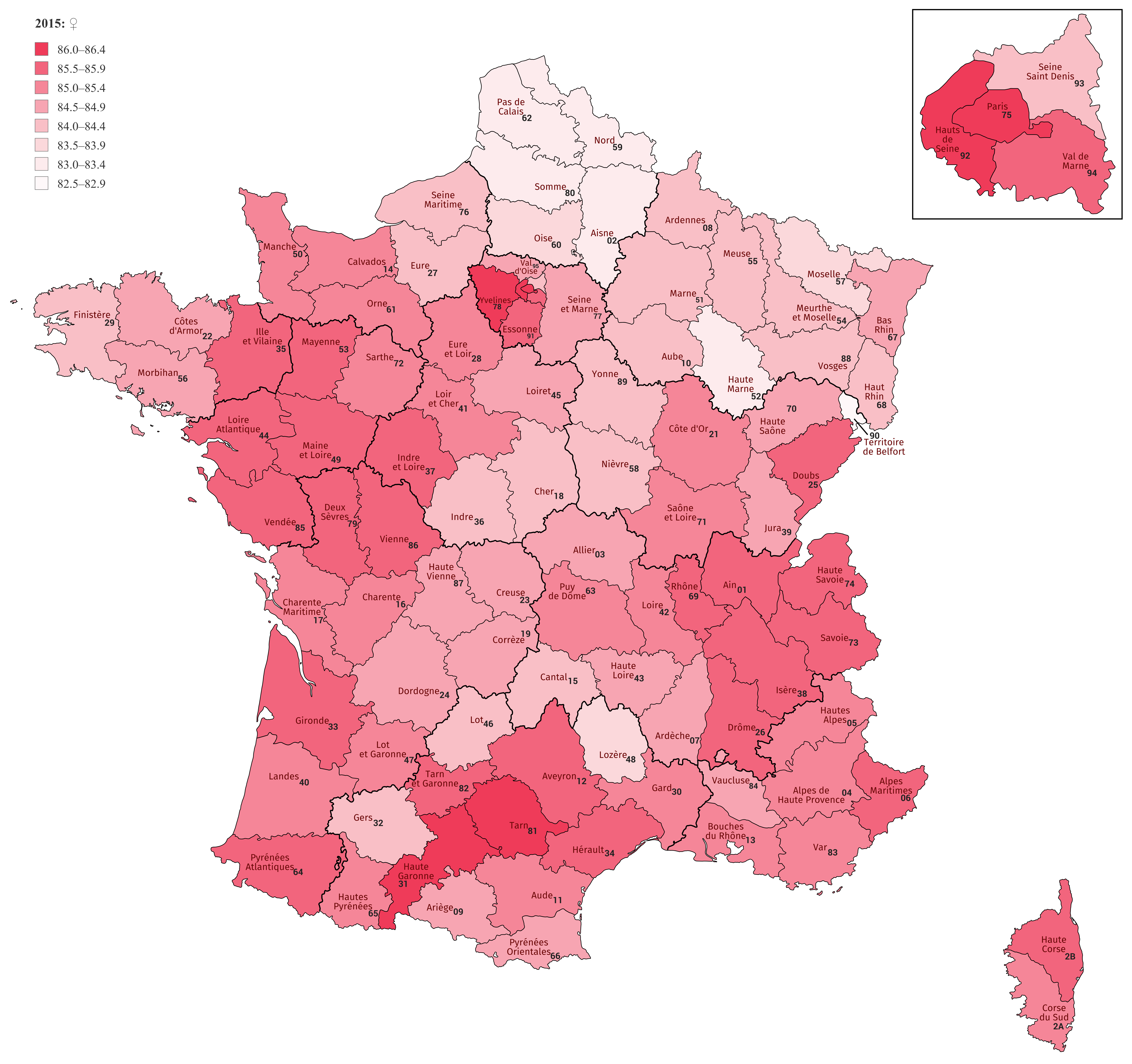
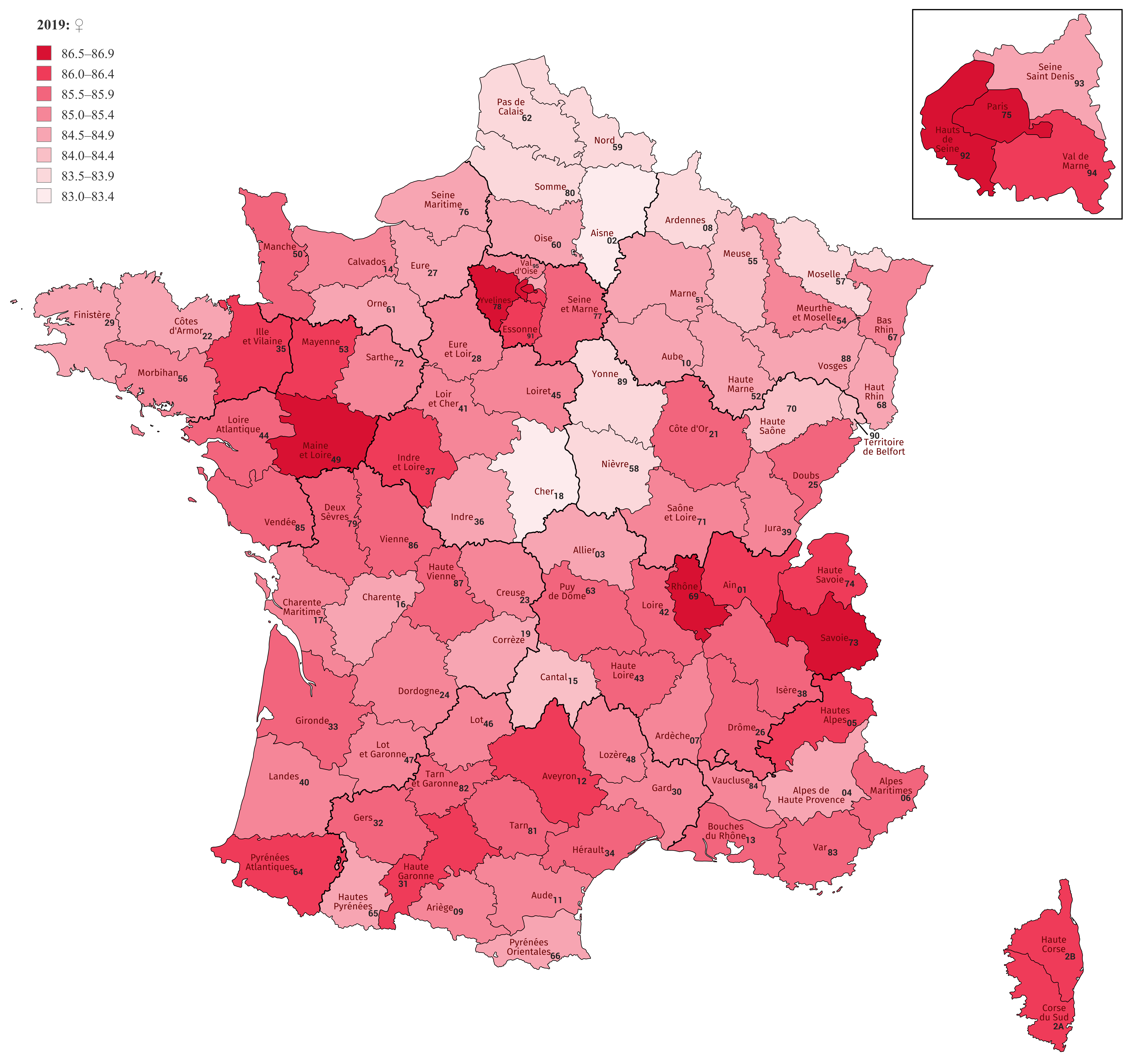
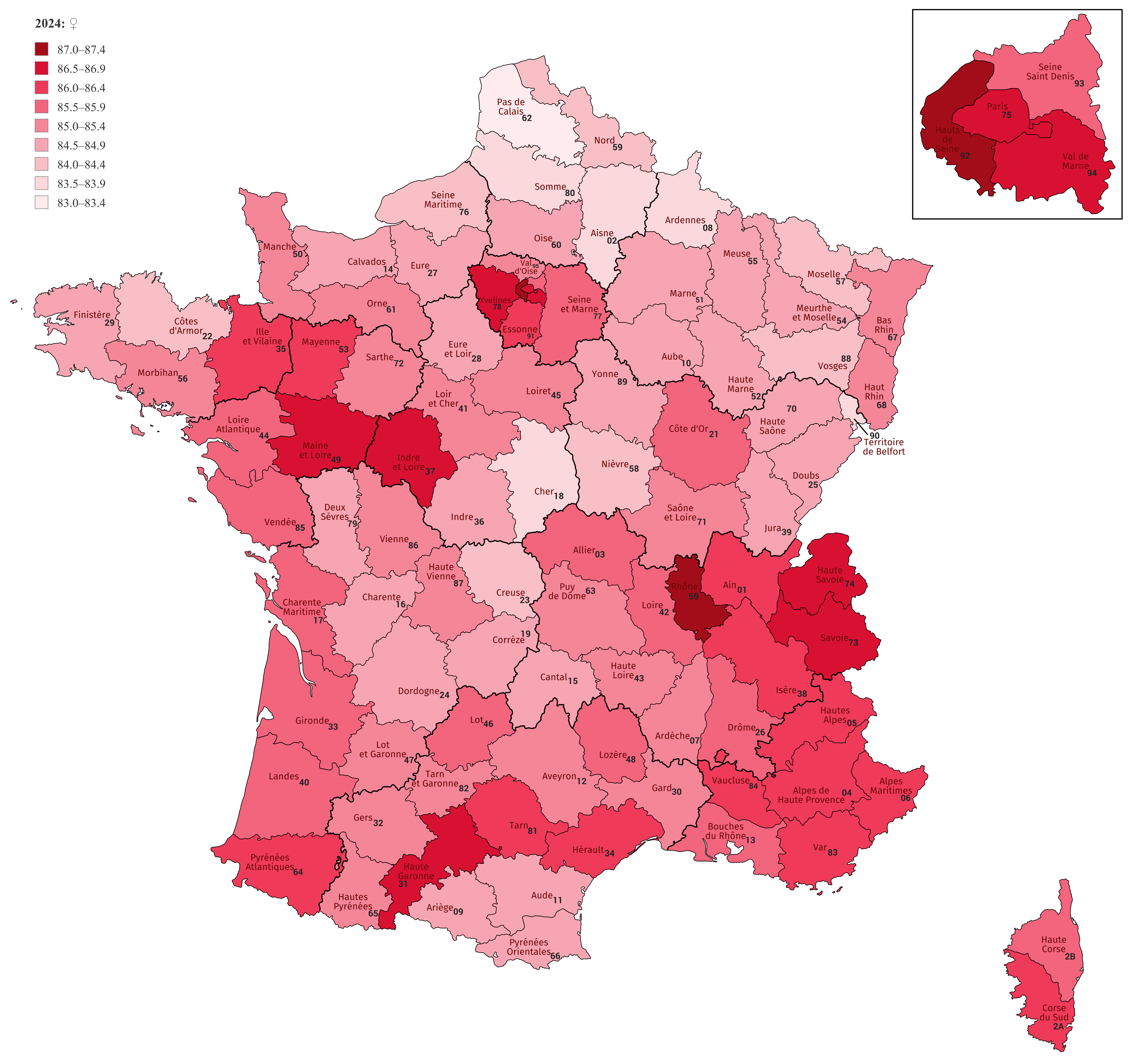
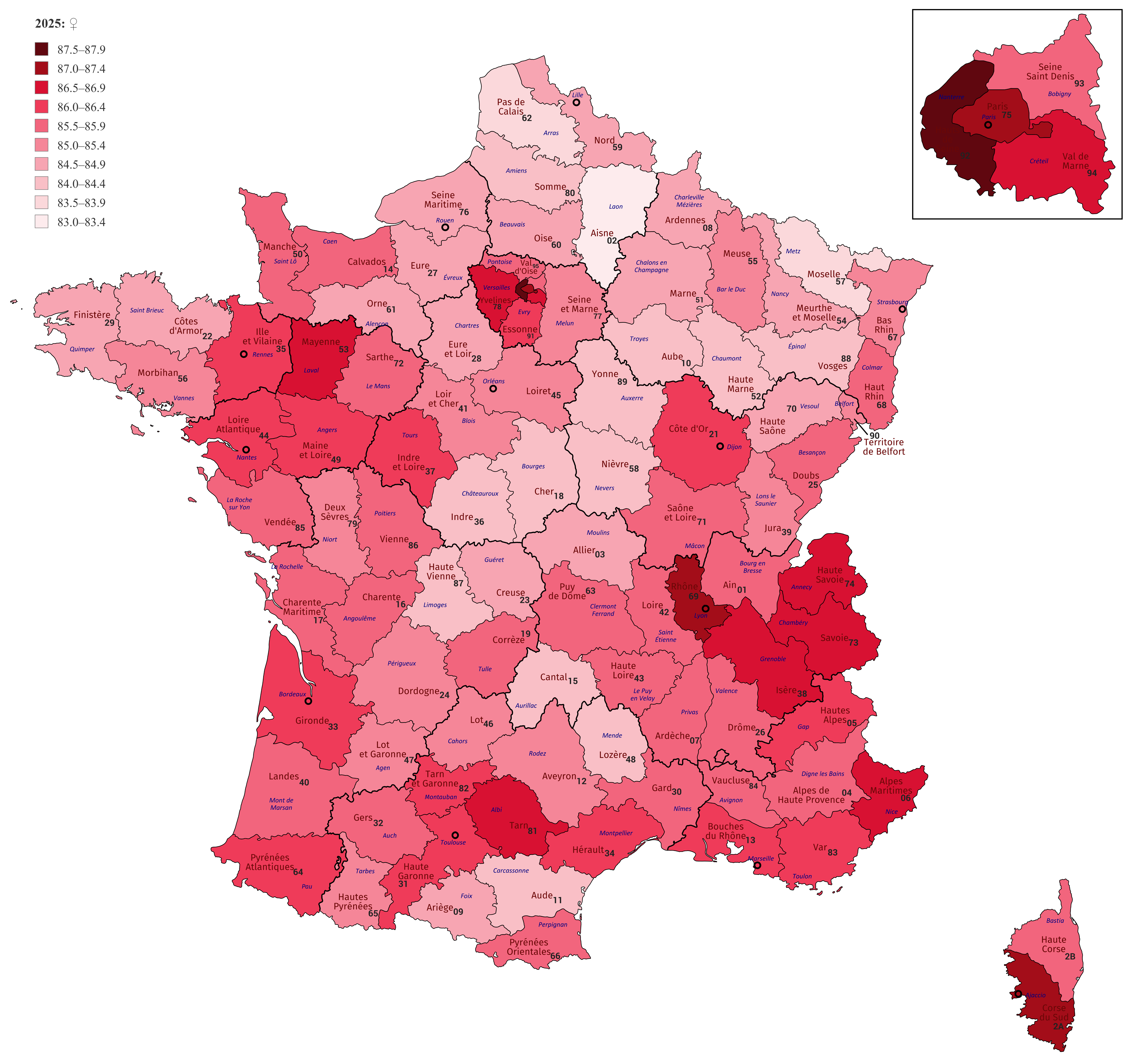
Life expectancy for female in the departments of metropolitan France in 2015, 2019, 2024 and 2025

== Eurostat (2014—2023) ==
By default the table is sorted by 2023.

code	region	2014				2014 →2019	2019				2019 →2023	2023				2014 →2023
code	region	overall	male	female	F Δ M	2014 →2019	overall	male	female	F Δ M	2019 →2023	overall	male	female	F Δ M	2014 →2023
	France on average	82.9	79.5	86.1	6.6	0.1	83.0	79.9	85.9	6.0	0.0	83.0	80.1	85.7	5.6	0.1
FR10	Île-de-France (Paris Region)	84.4	81.4	87.1	5.7	0.2	84.6	81.8	87.1	5.3	0.3	84.9	82.3	87.3	5.0	0.5
FRK2	Rhône-Alpes	84.0	80.9	86.9	6.0	0.1	84.1	81.2	86.8	5.6	0.3	84.4	81.7	86.9	5.2	0.4
FRM0	Corsica	83.2	80.4	86.1	5.7	0.8	84.0	81.5	86.5	5.0	−0.1	83.9	81.7	85.9	4.2	0.7
FRL0	Provence-Alpes-Côte d'Azur	83.4	80.1	86.4	6.3	0.0	83.4	80.5	86.2	5.7	0.3	83.7	80.8	86.3	5.5	0.3
FRJ2	Midi-Pyrénées	83.7	80.5	86.7	6.2	0.1	83.8	81.0	86.4	5.4	−0.2	83.6	81.1	86.1	5.0	−0.1
FRI1	Aquitaine	83.1	79.9	86.1	6.2	0.3	83.4	80.3	86.3	6.0	0.0	83.4	80.6	86.1	5.5	0.3
FRG0	Pays de la Loire	83.5	79.9	86.9	7.0	−0.1	83.4	80.1	86.6	6.5	0.0	83.4	80.4	86.4	6.0	−0.1
FRF1	Alsace	82.8	79.7	85.9	6.2	0.5	83.3	80.5	85.9	5.4	−0.3	83.0	80.4	85.5	5.1	0.2
FRJ1	Languedoc-Roussillon	82.8	79.5	86.0	6.5	0.3	83.1	80.1	86.0	5.9	−0.4	82.7	79.7	85.6	5.9	−0.1
FRI3	Poitou-Charentes	83.2	79.7	86.5	6.8	−0.4	82.8	79.6	85.9	6.3	−0.2	82.6	79.7	85.4	5.7	−0.6
FRB0	Centre-Val de Loire (Centre Region)	82.9	79.4	86.3	6.9	−0.2	82.7	79.6	85.7	6.1	−0.1	82.6	79.6	85.5	5.9	−0.3
FRH0	Brittany	82.3	78.6	85.8	7.2	0.2	82.5	79.0	85.9	6.9	0.0	82.5	79.6	85.4	5.8	0.2
FRK1	Auvergne	82.5	78.9	86.1	7.2	0.0	82.5	79.3	85.7	6.4	−0.1	82.4	79.5	85.3	5.8	−0.1
FRC2	Franche-Comté	82.7	79.4	86.0	6.6	0.1	82.8	79.7	85.9	6.2	−0.5	82.3	79.5	85.1	5.6	−0.4
FRI2	Limousin	82.7	79.0	86.4	7.4	−0.4	82.3	78.9	85.7	6.8	0.0	82.3	79.3	85.3	6.0	−0.4
FRY4	Réunion (in the Indian Ocean)	81.0	77.3	84.4	7.1	0.3	81.3	77.5	85.0	7.5	1.0	82.3	79.3	85.2	5.9	1.3
FRD1	Lower Normandy	82.4	78.8	85.9	7.1	0.1	82.5	79.0	85.8	6.8	−0.2	82.3	79.1	85.4	6.3	−0.1
FRC1	Burgundy	82.4	78.8	85.9	7.1	0.0	82.4	79.3	85.6	6.3	−0.2	82.2	79.2	85.3	6.1	−0.2
FRF3	Lorraine	81.9	78.6	85.1	6.5	0.1	82.0	79.0	84.9	5.9	−0.1	81.9	79.1	84.7	5.6	0.0
FRD2	Upper Normandy	81.5	77.9	84.9	7.0	0.3	81.8	78.5	85.0	6.5	0.1	81.9	78.9	84.9	6.0	0.4
FRF2	Champagne-Ardenne	81.9	78.3	85.3	7.0	−0.1	81.8	78.4	85.1	6.7	0.0	81.8	78.6	84.9	6.3	−0.1
FRY2	Martinique (in the Caribbean)	81.5	78.2	84.4	6.2	0.6	82.1	78.7	85.2	6.5	−0.4	81.7	78.6	84.3	5.7	0.2
FRE2	Picardy	81.1	77.7	84.4	6.7	0.3	81.4	78.3	84.5	6.2	0.0	81.4	78.5	84.3	5.8	0.3
FRE1	Nord-Pas-de-Calais	80.6	76.8	84.2	7.4	0.5	81.1	77.6	84.4	6.8	0.1	81.2	77.9	84.3	6.4	0.6
FRY1	Guadeloupe (incl. Saint Martin, in the Caribbean)	80.6	76.4	84.6	8.2	1.2	81.8	77.8	85.5	7.7	−1.2	80.6	76.6	84.1	7.5	0.0
FRY3	French Guiana (in South America)	—	—	—	—	—	—	—	—	—	—	79.3	76.1	82.5	6.4	—
FRY5	Mayotte (in the Indian Ocean)	77.0	75.4	78.7	3.3	−1.1	75.9	75.5	76.3	0.8	−1.0	74.9	73.5	76.2	2.7	−2.1

Data source: Eurostat

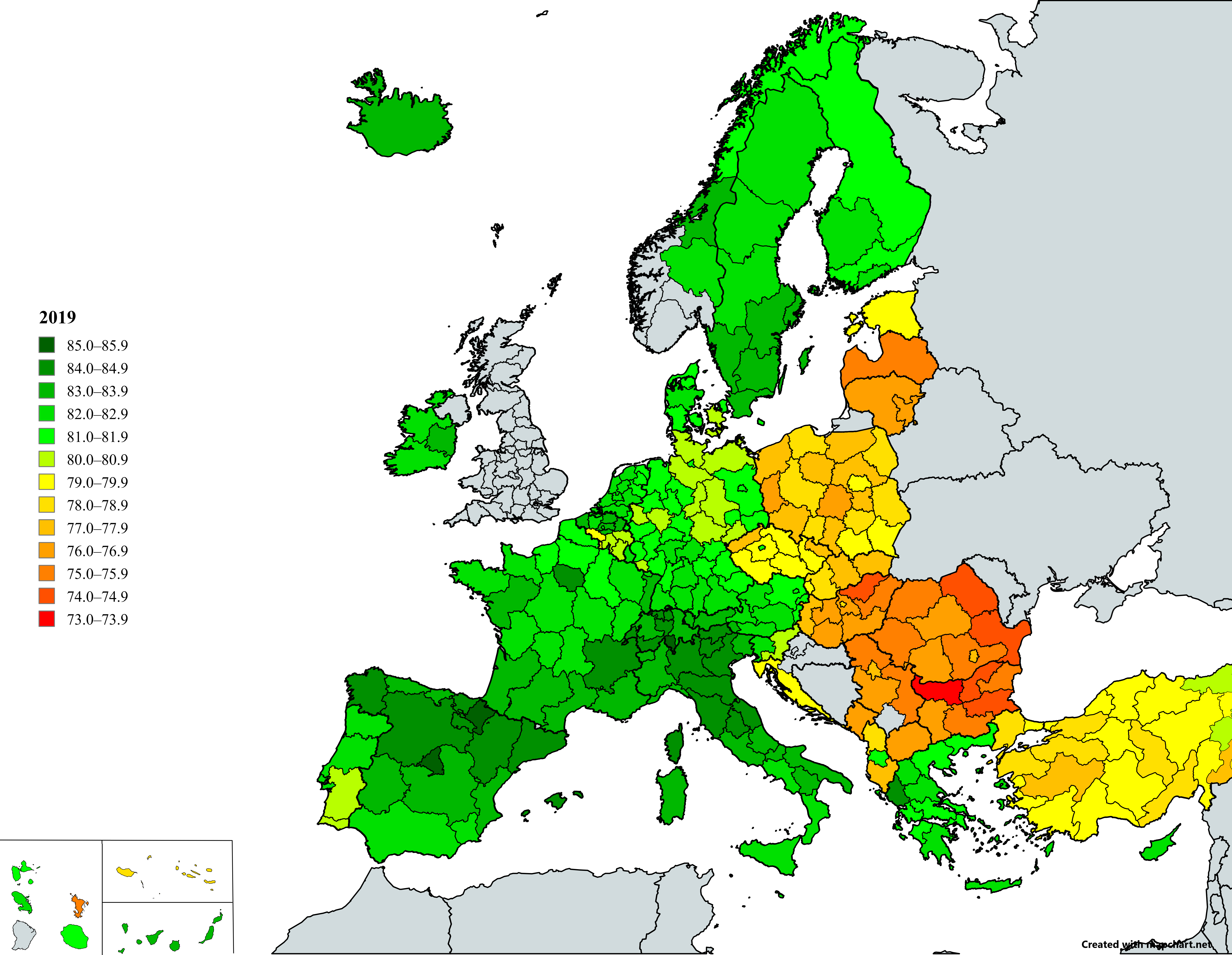
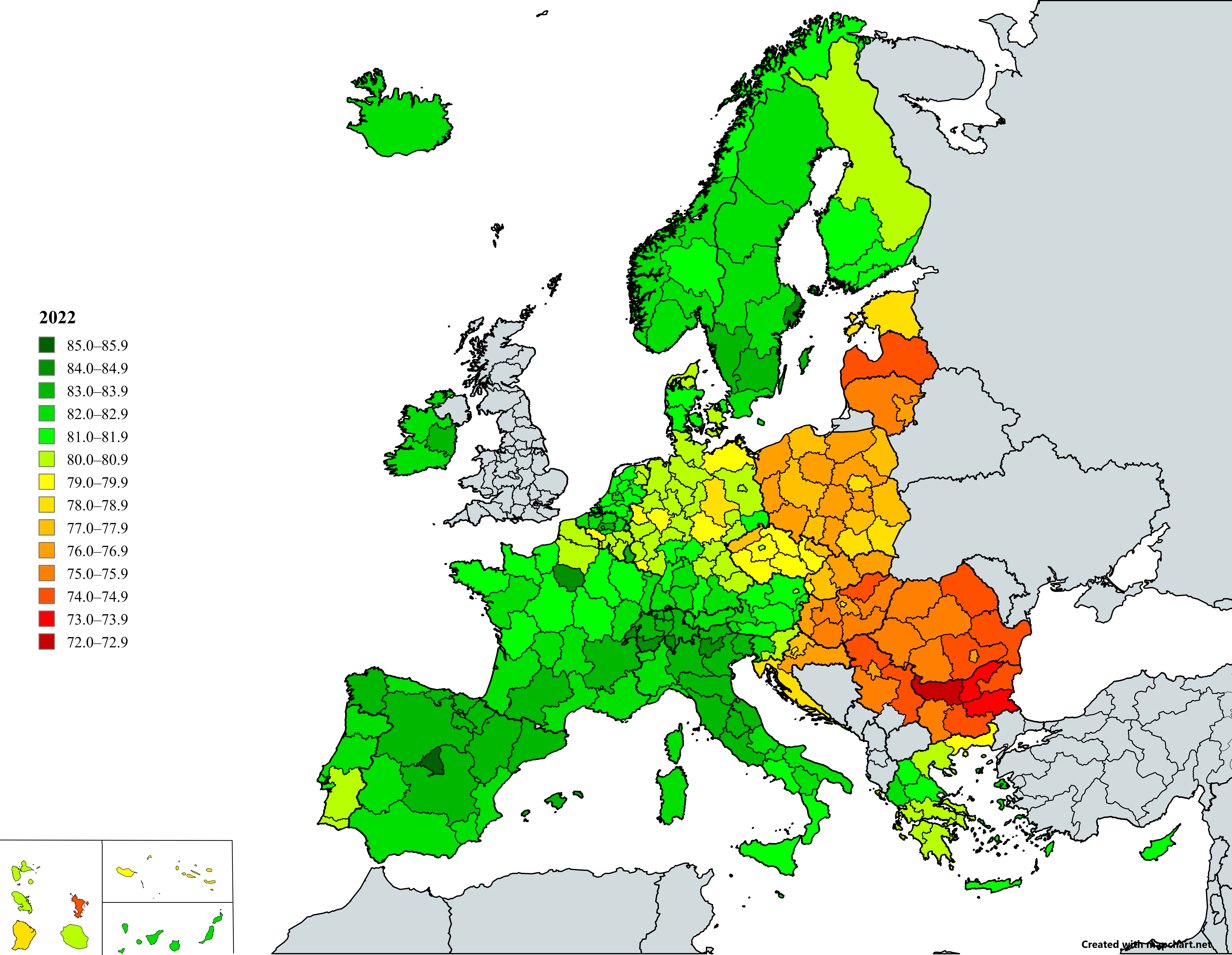
Life expectancy in French regions in comparison with regions of other European countries in 2019 and 2022, according to Eurostat (legends on the maps are identical)

== Global Data Lab (2019–2022) ==
region	2019				2019 →2021	2021	2021 →2022	2022				2019 →2022
region	overall	male	female	F Δ M	2019 →2021	overall	2021 →2022	overall	male	female	F Δ M	2019 →2022
France on average	82.73	79.72	85.61	5.89	−0.23	82.50	0.73	83.23	80.36	85.97	5.61	0.50
Île-de-France (Paris Region)	84.21	81.46	86.68	5.22	−0.41	83.80	1.11	84.91	82.29	87.31	5.02	0.70
Rhône-Alpes	83.71	80.87	86.38	5.51	0.09	83.80	0.71	84.51	81.68	87.11	5.43	0.80
Midi-Pyrénées	83.41	80.67	85.98	5.31	0.09	83.50	0.30	83.80	81.27	86.40	5.13	0.39
Corsica (in the Mediterranean Sea)	83.61	81.17	86.08	4.91	−0.21	83.40	0.30	83.70	81.07	86.20	5.13	0.09
Provence-Alpes-Côte d'Azur	83.01	80.17	85.78	5.61	−0.61	82.40	1.20	83.60	80.77	86.20	5.43	0.59
Pays de la Loire	83.01	79.77	86.18	6.41	0.09	83.10	0.40	83.50	80.36	86.40	6.04	0.49
Aquitaine	83.01	79.97	85.88	5.91	0.09	83.10	0.30	83.40	80.77	85.90	5.13	0.39
Alsace	82.91	80.17	85.49	5.32	−0.01	82.90	0.19	83.09	80.57	85.49	4.92	0.18
Franche-Comté	82.42	79.37	85.49	6.12	−0.02	82.40	0.49	82.89	80.06	85.70	5.64	0.47
Languedoc-Roussillon	82.72	79.77	85.59	5.82	−0.42	82.30	0.59	82.89	79.96	85.70	5.74	0.17
Auvergne	82.12	78.97	85.29	6.32	−0.02	82.10	0.69	82.79	79.76	85.70	5.94	0.67
Limousin	81.92	78.58	85.29	6.71	0.18	82.10	0.69	82.79	79.76	85.70	5.94	0.87
Centre-Val de Loire (Centre Region)	82.32	79.27	85.29	6.02	−0.12	82.20	0.49	82.69	79.86	85.59	5.73	0.37
Brittany	82.12	78.68	85.49	6.81	0.28	82.40	0.29	82.69	79.56	85.80	6.24	0.57
Poitou-Charentes	82.42	79.27	85.49	6.22	−0.12	82.30	0.39	82.69	79.35	85.90	6.55	0.27
Burgundy	82.02	78.97	85.19	6.22	0.28	82.30	0.19	82.49	79.46	85.49	6.03	0.47
Champagne-Ardenne	81.42	78.08	84.69	6.61	−0.22	81.20	0.99	82.19	79.05	85.29	6.24	0.77
Lower Normandy	82.12	78.68	85.39	6.71	−0.42	81.70	0.38	82.08	78.95	85.29	6.34	−0.04
Lorraine	81.62	78.68	84.49	5.81	−0.32	81.30	0.68	81.98	79.25	84.69	5.44	0.36
Upper Normandy	81.42	78.18	84.59	6.41	−0.02	81.40	0.38	81.78	78.75	84.69	5.94	0.36
Picardy	81.02	77.98	84.09	6.11	−0.32	80.70	0.98	81.68	78.65	84.59	5.94	0.66
Nord-Pas-de-Calais	80.72	77.28	83.99	6.71	−0.32	80.40	0.88	81.28	77.94	84.49	6.55	0.56
Guadeloupe (in the Caribbean)	81.42	77.48	85.09	7.61	−3.82	77.60	3.37	80.97	76.93	84.69	7.76	−0.45
Martinique (in the Caribbean)	81.72	78.38	84.79	6.41	−3.52	78.20	2.57	80.77	77.84	83.48	5.64	−0.95
Réunion (in the Indian Ocean)	80.92	77.18	84.59	7.41	−0.02	80.90	−0.13	80.77	77.64	83.78	6.14	−0.15
French Guiana (in South America)	78.14	75.04	81.36	6.32	−0.94	77.20	2.16	79.36	76.12	82.67	6.55	1.22
Mayotte (in the Indian Ocean)	75.55	75.19	75.93	0.74	−4.05	71.50	3.52	75.02	74.81	75.01	0.20	−0.53

Data source: Global Data Lab

== Probability of dying, 2023–2025 ==
The probability of dying is a statistical indicator that shows the proportion of people who die at a given age to those who have reached that age. Strictly speaking, this is not a probability, but a frequency of deaths.

The table shows average values for France for the period 2023—2025. The French national statistical agency INSEE publishes data only up to age of 100, that is insufficient to estimate the slowdown in acceleration of mortality at later ages for this country.

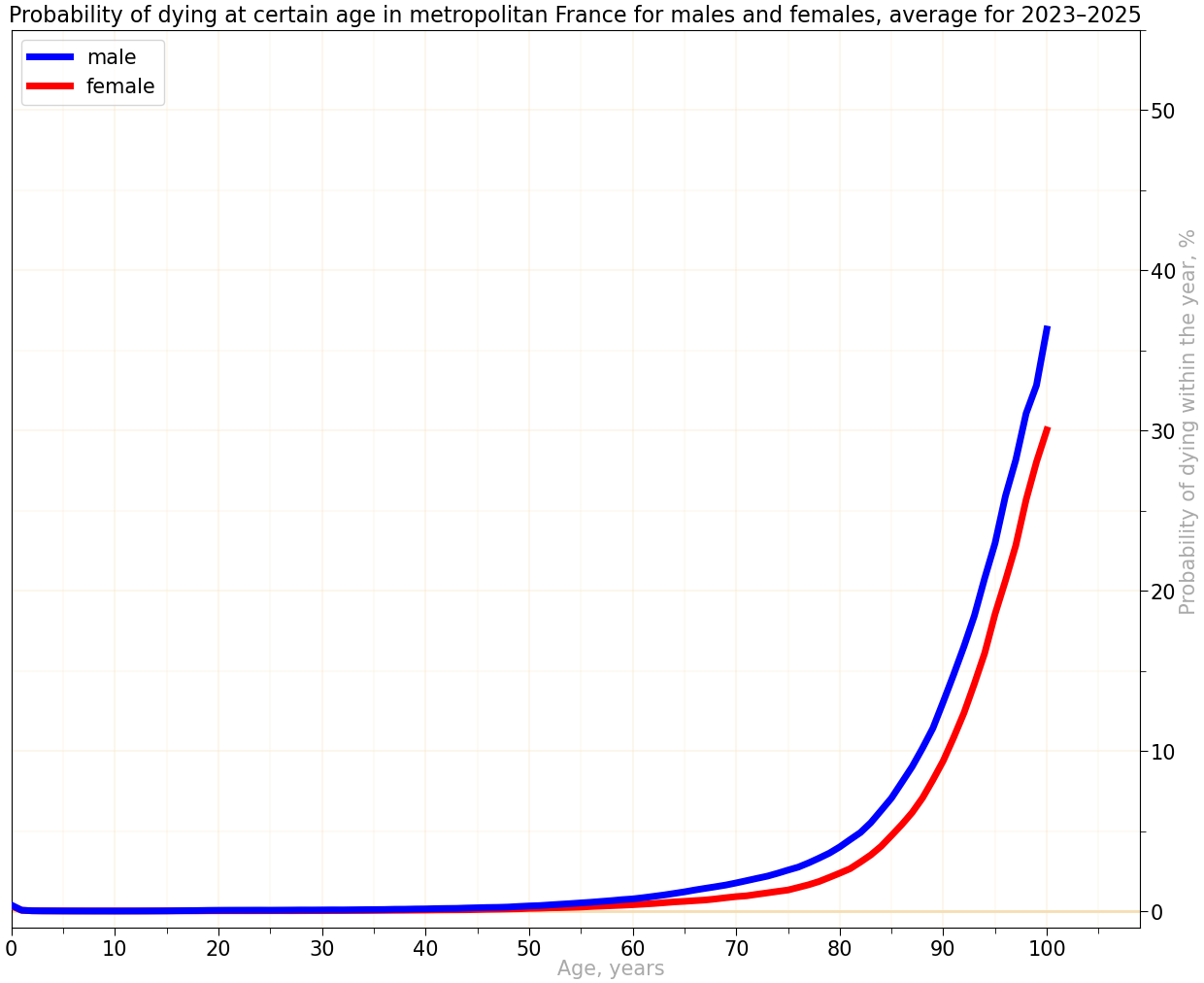
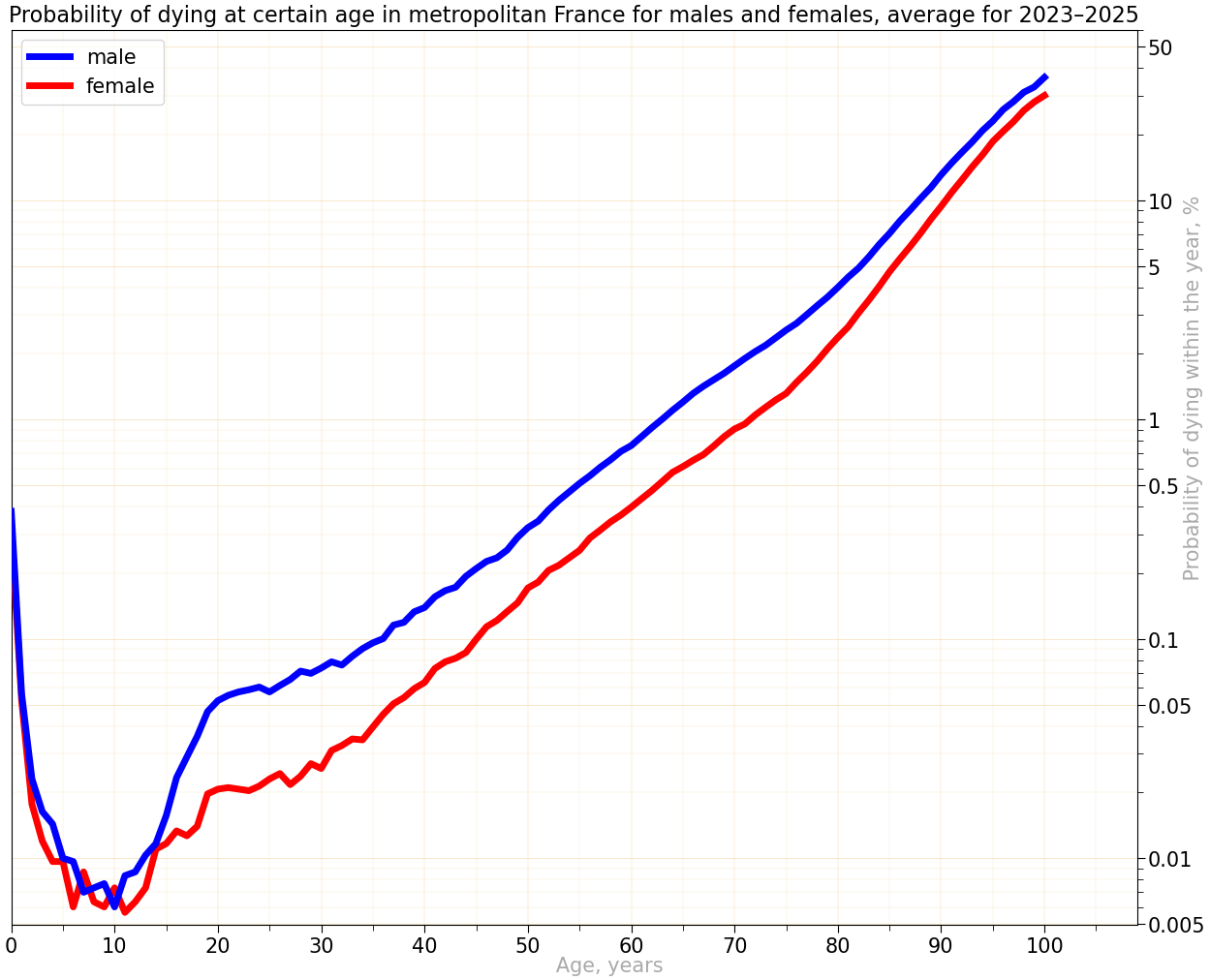
According chart of the probability of dying in Spain for male and female. The chart is made in two versions: using linear and logarithmic scales.
The probability of dying between ages of 40 and 90 doubles every 7.9 years for male and 7.4 years for female.

Age	Probability of dying, %		M / F
Age	male	female	M / F
0	0.382	0.320	1.19
1	0.056	0.053	1.07
5	0.010	0.010	1.03
10	0.006	0.007	0.82
15	0.016	0.012	1.34
20	0.052	0.021	2.53
25	0.057	0.023	2.49
30	0.074	0.026	2.87
35	0.096	0.040	2.42
40	0.139	0.063	2.19
45	0.209	0.100	2.10
50	0.322	0.171	1.88
55	0.512	0.253	2.02
60	0.761	0.399	1.91
65	1.202	0.610	1.97
70	1.758	0.906	1.94
75	2.559	1.316	1.95
80	4.005	2.368	1.69
85	7.056	4.717	1.50
90	13.065	9.382	1.39
95	22.960	18.538	1.24
99	32.810	28.026	1.17
100	36.316	30.024	1.21

Data source: INSEE

== Charts ==
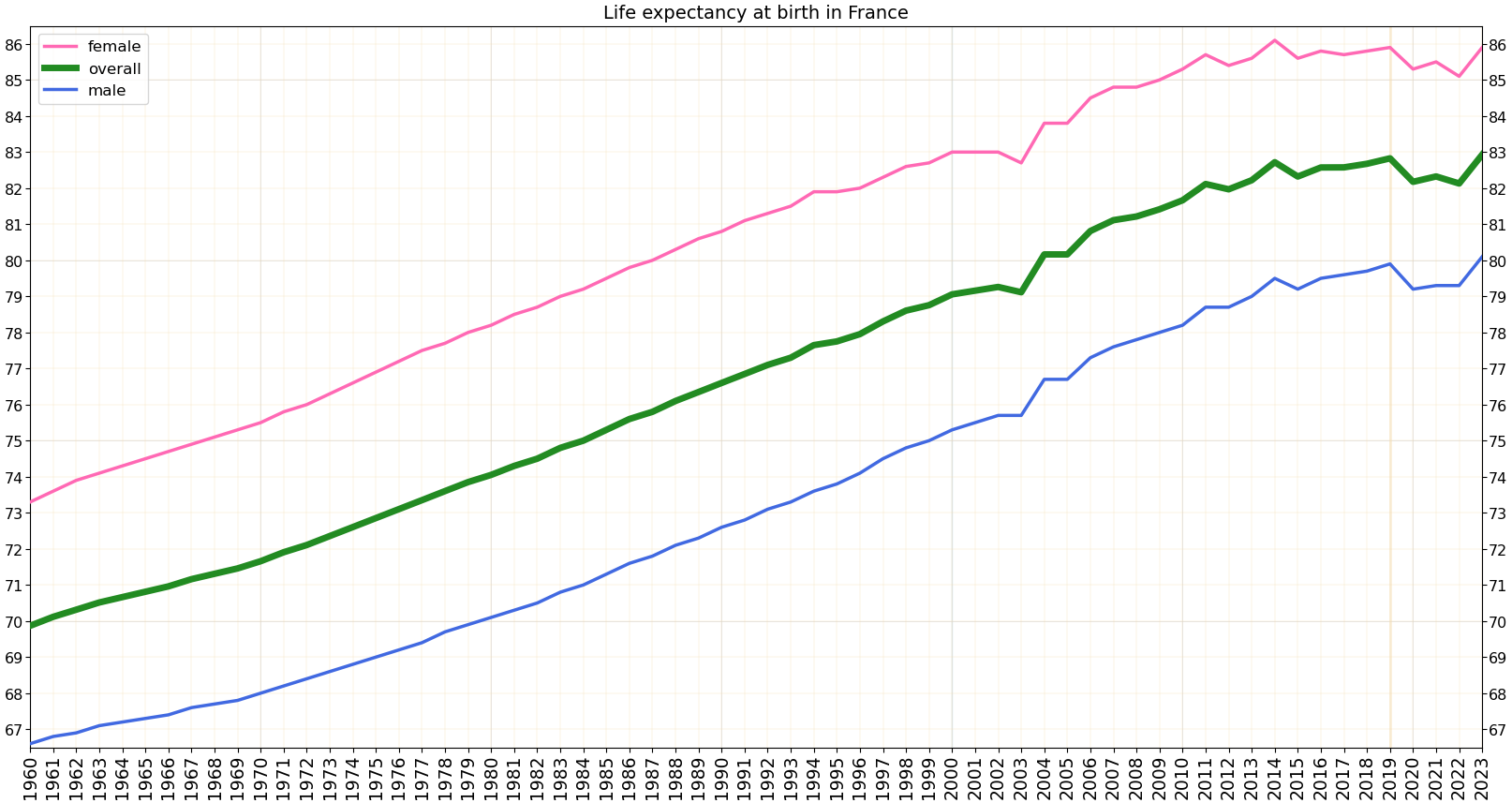
Development of life expectancy in France according to estimation of the World Bank Group

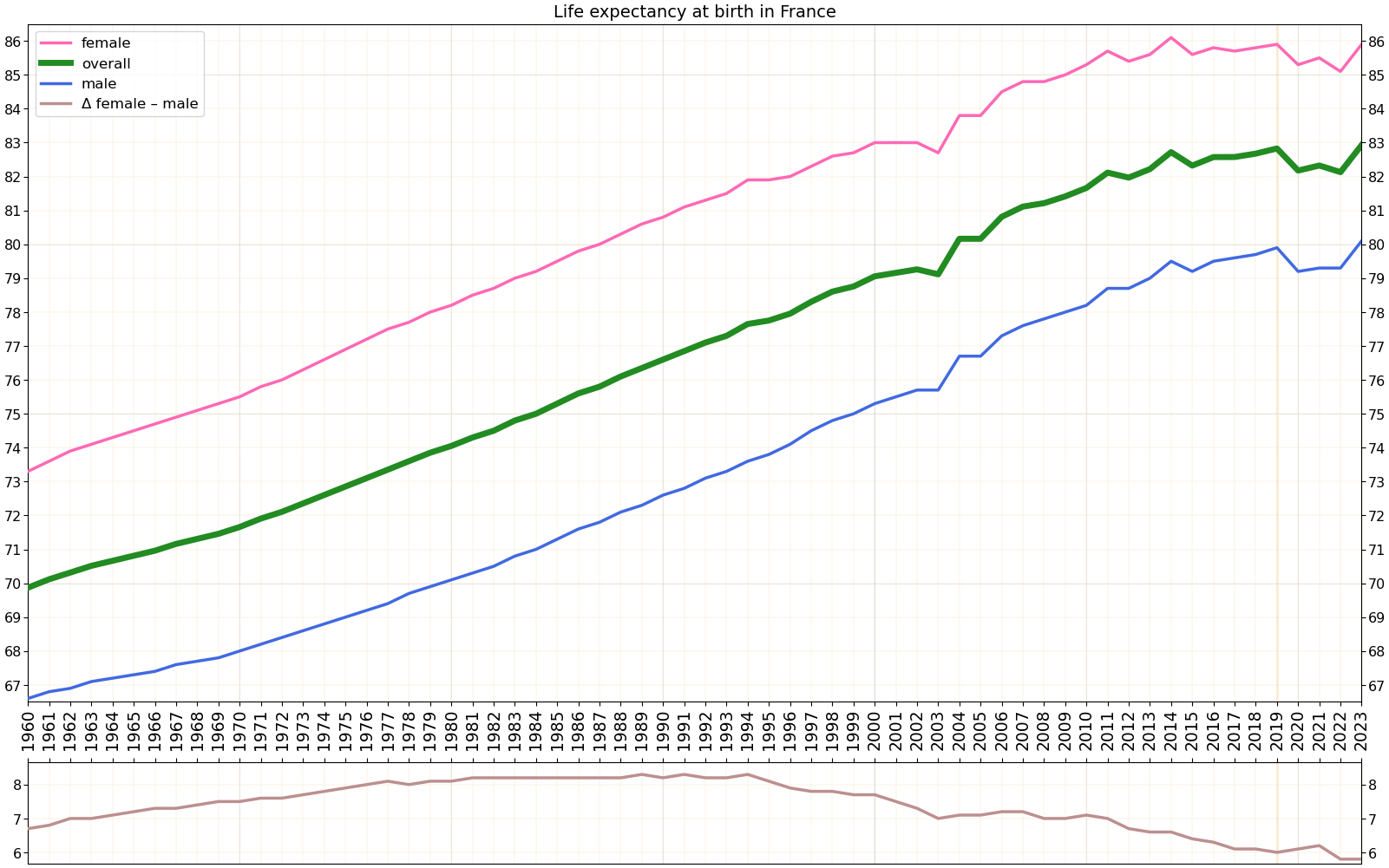
Life expectancy with calculated sex gap

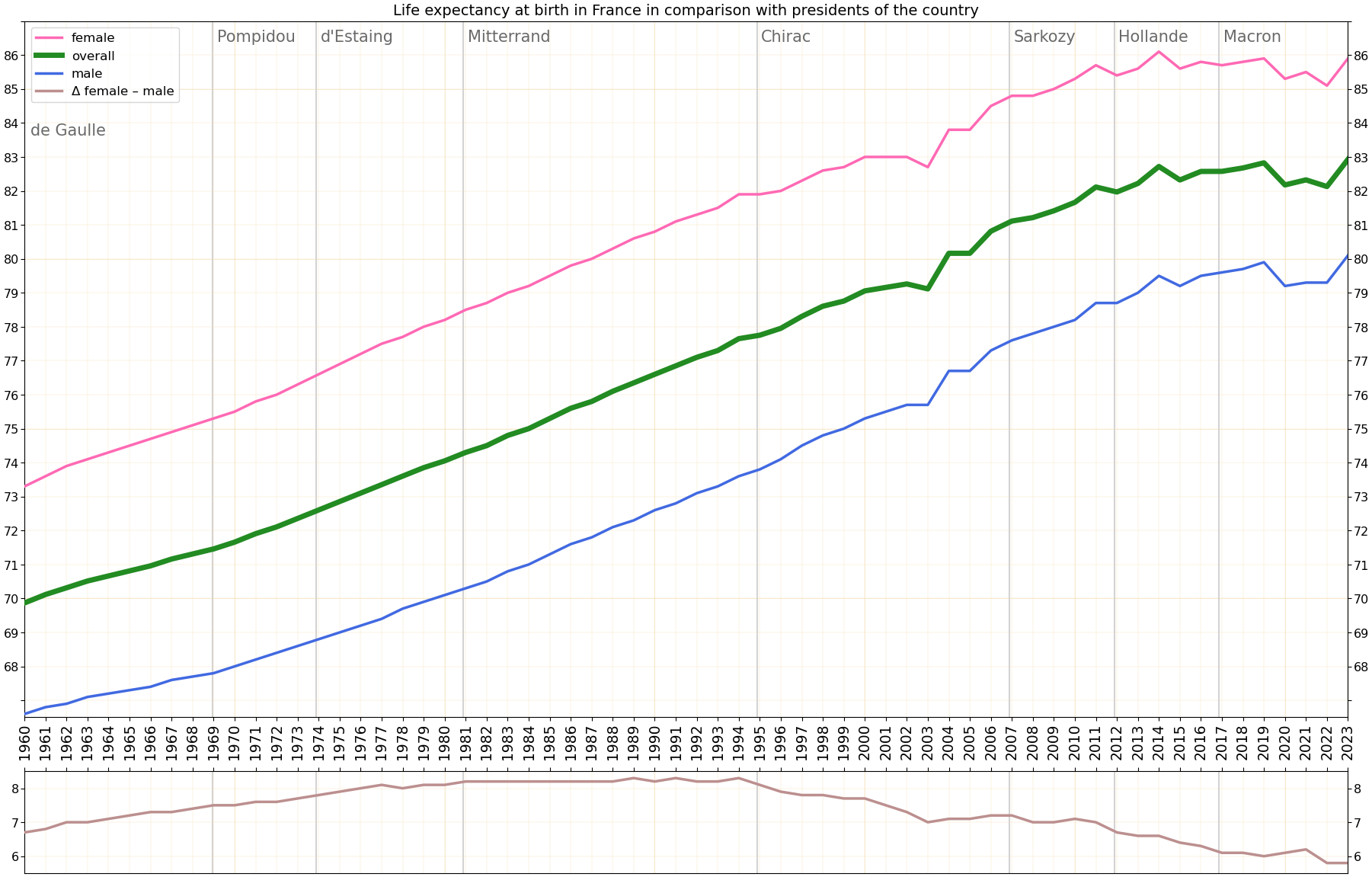
Life expectancy in comparison to presidents of the country

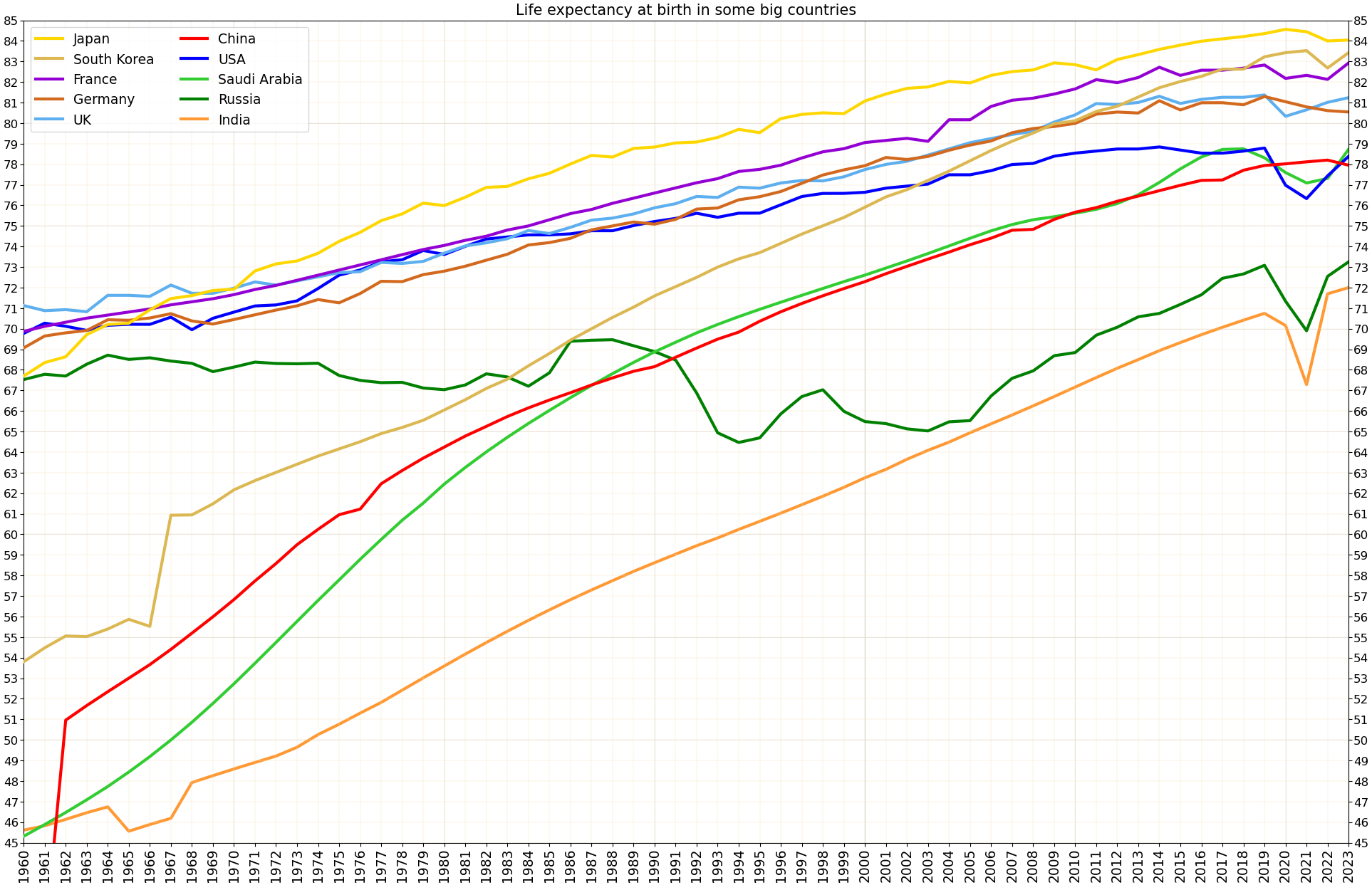
Development of life expectancy in France in comparison to some big countries of the world

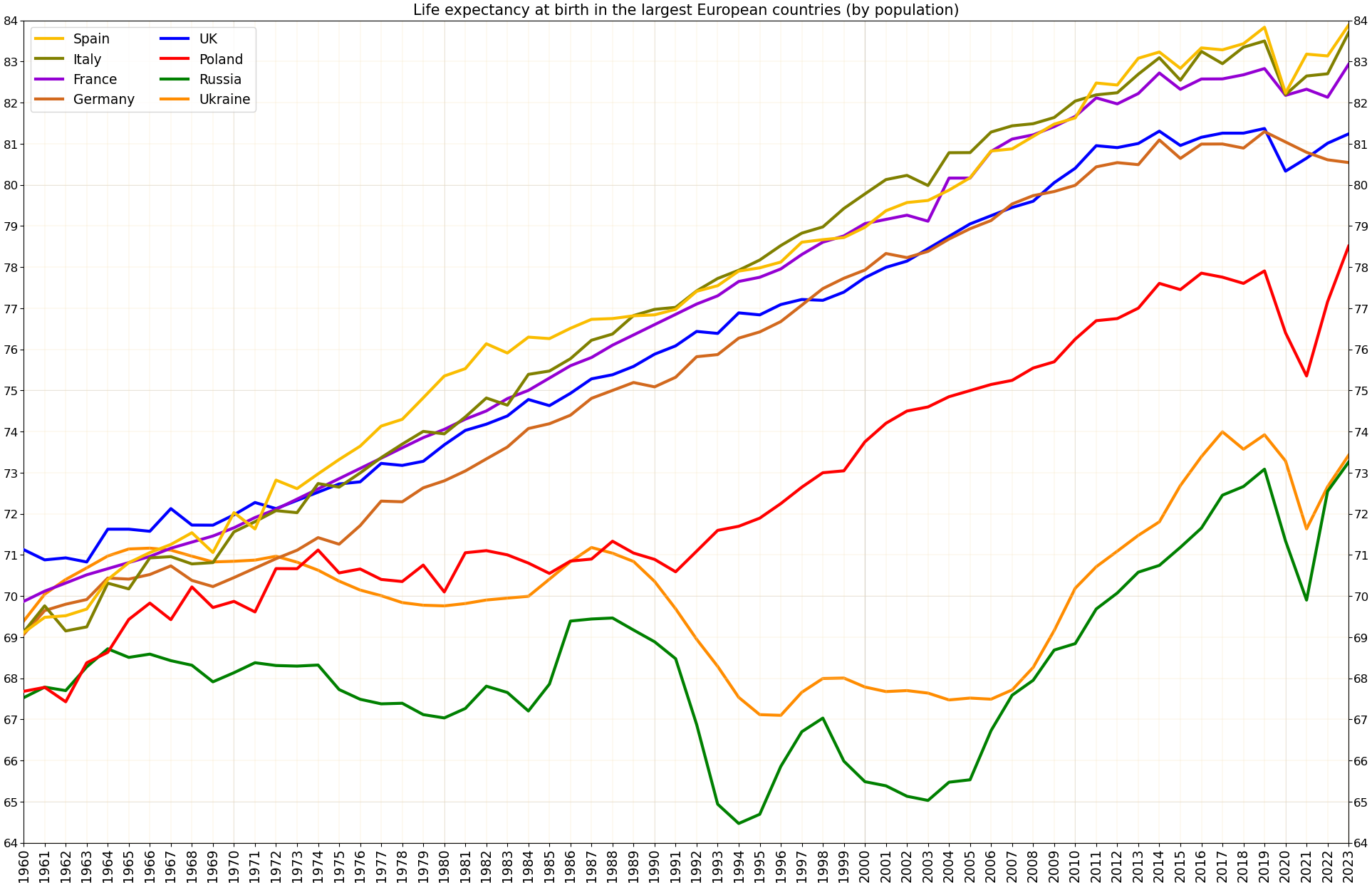
Development of life expectancy in France in comparison to the largest by population European countries

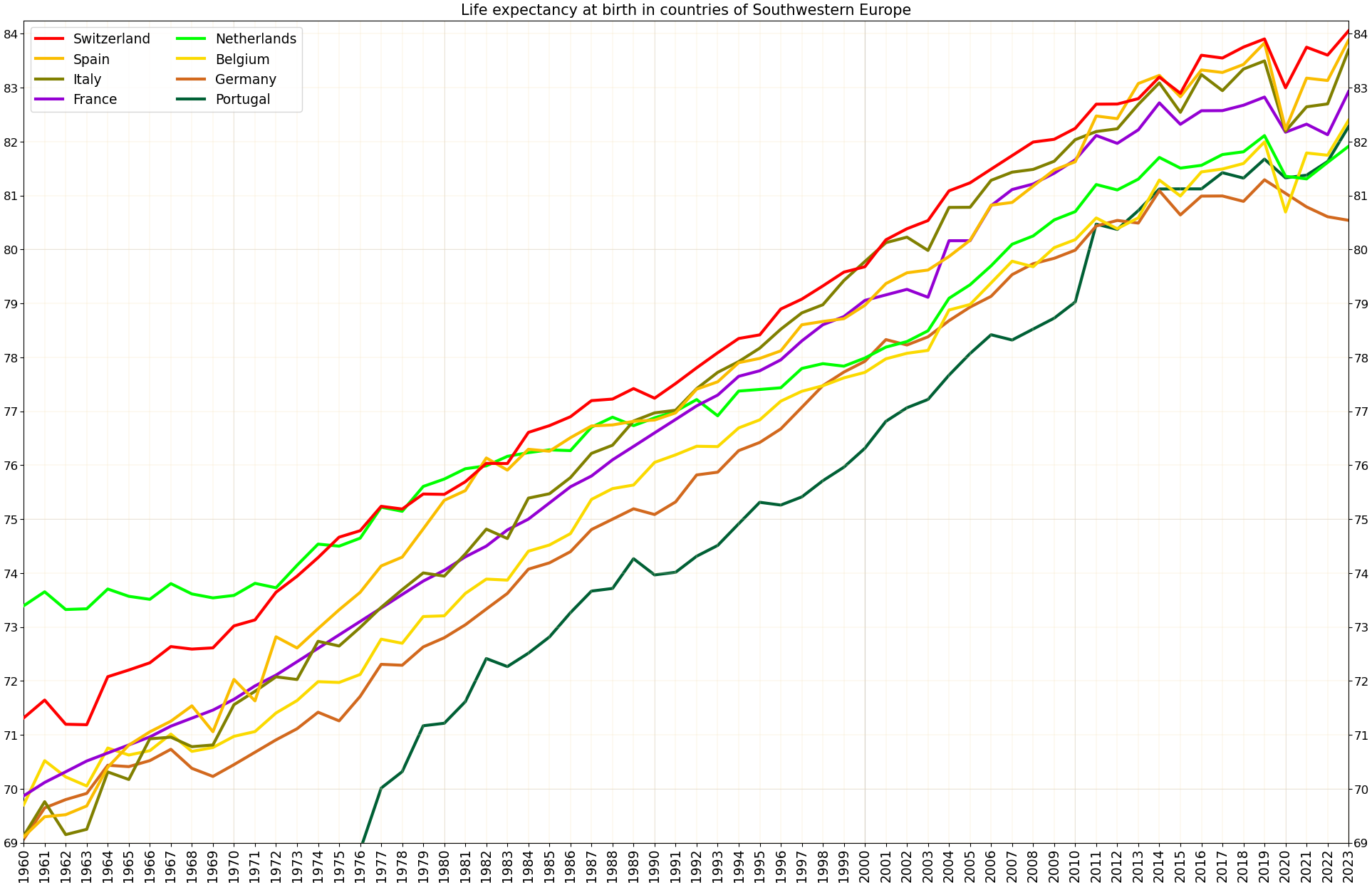
Development of life expectancy in France in comparison to neighboring countries
Life expectancy and healthy life expectancy in France on the background of other countries of the world in 2019

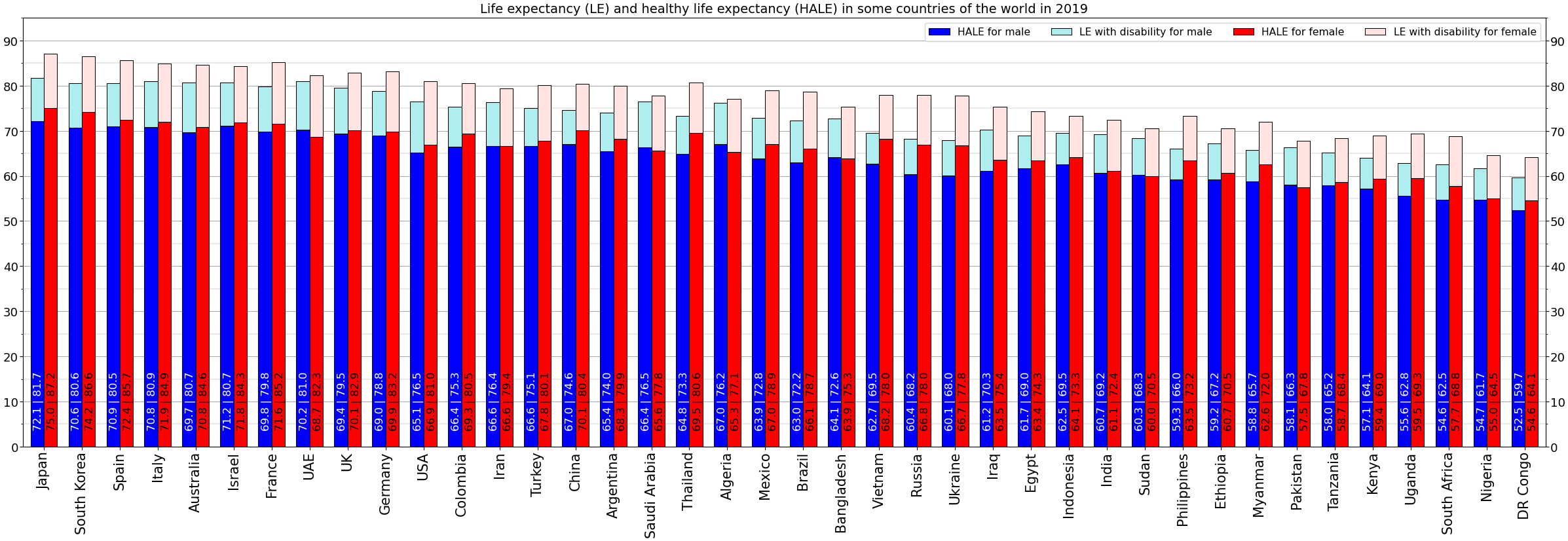
Life expectancy and healthy life expectancy for males and females separately
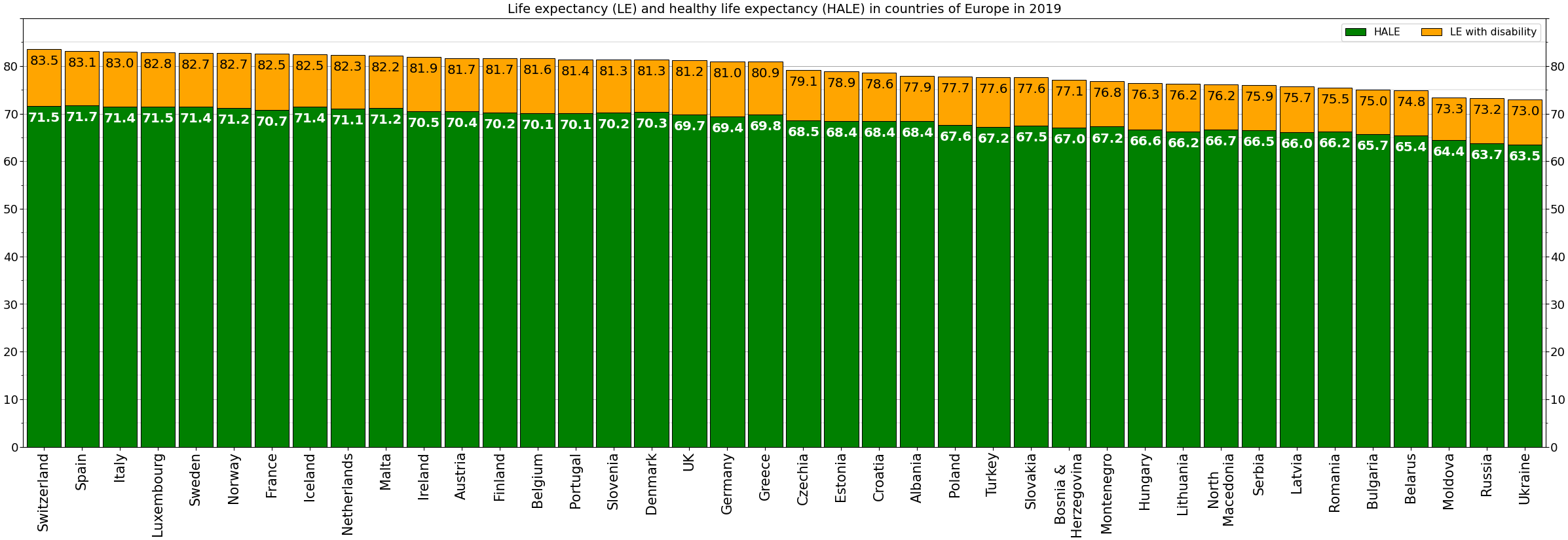
Life expectancy and healthy life expectancy in France on the background of other countries of Europe in 2019

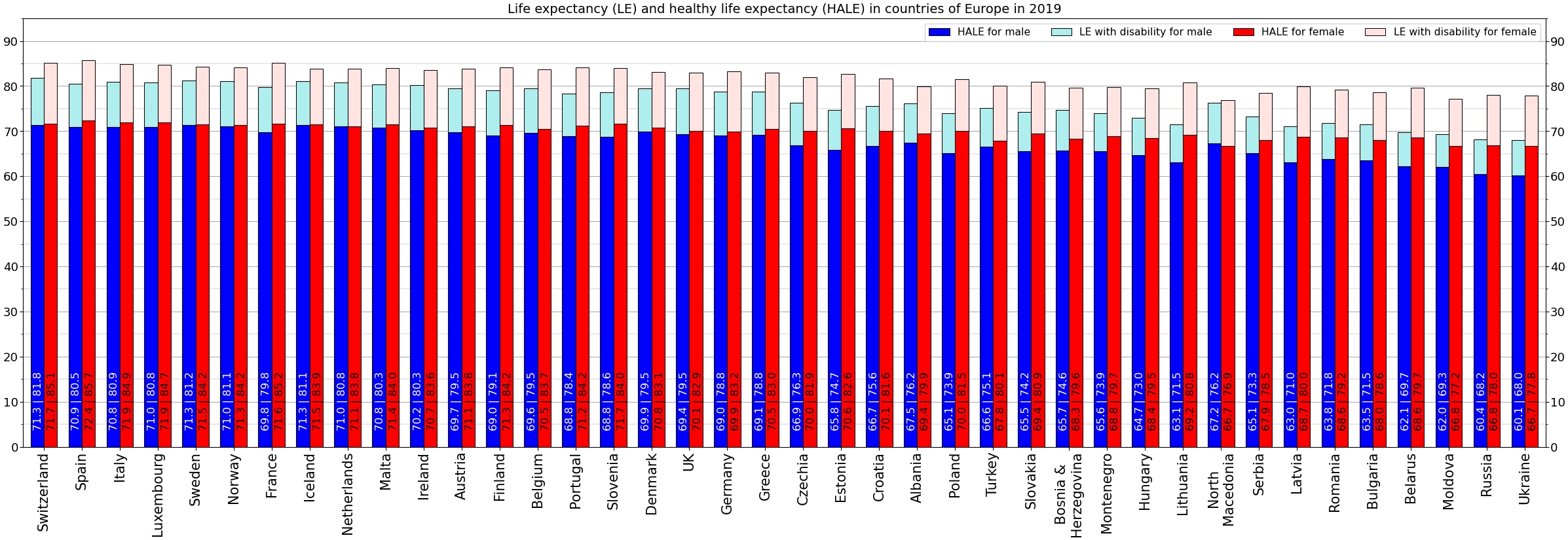
Life expectancy and healthy life expectancy for males and females separately

== See also ==
- List of countries by life expectancy
- List of European countries by life expectancy
- Demographics of France
- French paradox
