= Auvergne (administrative region) =

Auvergne Auvèrnhe / Auvèrnha (Occitan)
- Region of France
- Flag Coat of arms

- Coordinates: 45°20′N 3°00′E
- Country: France
- Dissolved: 31 December 2015
- Prefecture: Clermont-Ferrand
- Departments: 4: Allier (03); Cantal (15); Haute-Loire (43); Puy-de-Dôme (63)

Government
  - President: René Souchon (PS)

Area
  - Total: 26,013 km^{2} (10,044 sq mi)

Population (2013-01-01)
  - Total: 1,357,668
  - Density: 52.192/km^{2} (135.18/sq mi)
- Time zone: UTC+1 (CET)
  - Summer (DST): UTC+2 (CEST)
- ISO 3166 code: FR-C
- GDP (2012): Ranked 19th
- Total: €33.8 billion (US$47.29 bn)
- Per capita: €24,920 (US$34,868)
- NUTS Region: FR7
- Website: auvergne.fr

Auvergne (/oʊˈvɛərn(jə), oʊˈvɜːrn/; French: [ovɛʁɲ]; Occitan: Auvèrnhe or Auvèrnha) is a former administrative region in central France, comprising the four departments of Allier, Puy-de-Dôme, Cantal and Haute-Loire. On 1 January 2016, the region was merged with surrounding historical regions to form a new first-level administrative region of Auvergne-Rhône-Alpes.

The administrative region of Auvergne is larger than the historical province of Auvergne, one of the seven counties of Occitania, and includes provinces and areas that historically were not part of Auvergne. The Auvergne region is composed of the following old provinces:

- Auvergne: departments of Puy-de-Dôme, Cantal, northwest of Haute-Loire, and extreme south of Allier. The province of Auvergne is entirely contained inside the Auvergne region
- Bourbonnais: department of Allier. A small part of Bourbonnais lies outside Auvergne, in the neighbouring Centre-Val de Loire region (south of the department of Cher).
- Velay: centre and southeast of the department of Haute-Loire. Velay is entirely contained inside the Auvergne region.
- a small part of Gévaudan: extreme southwest of Haute-Loire. Gévaudan is essentially inside the Languedoc-Roussillon region.
- a small part of Vivarais: extreme southeast of Haute-Loire. Vivarais is essentially inside the Rhône-Alpes region.
- a small part of Forez: extreme northeast of Haute-Loire. Forez is essentially inside the Rhône-Alpes region.

Velay, Gévaudan, and Vivarais are often considered to be sub-provinces of the old province of Languedoc. Forez is also often considered to be a sub-province of Lyonnais. Therefore, the modern region of Auvergne is composed of the provinces of Auvergne, part of Bourbonnais, and parts of Languedoc and Lyonnais.

== Geography ==
Auvergne had an area of 26,013 square kilometres (10,044 sq mi), which is 4.8% of France's total area. Auvergne was one of the smallest regions in France during its existence.

Auvergne was bordered by the administrative regions of Centre-Val de Loire and Burgundy to the north, Rhône-Alpes to the east, Languedoc-Roussillon and Midi-Pyrénées to the south, and Limousin.
