= Cutlery of Thiers =

Thiers' traditional activity

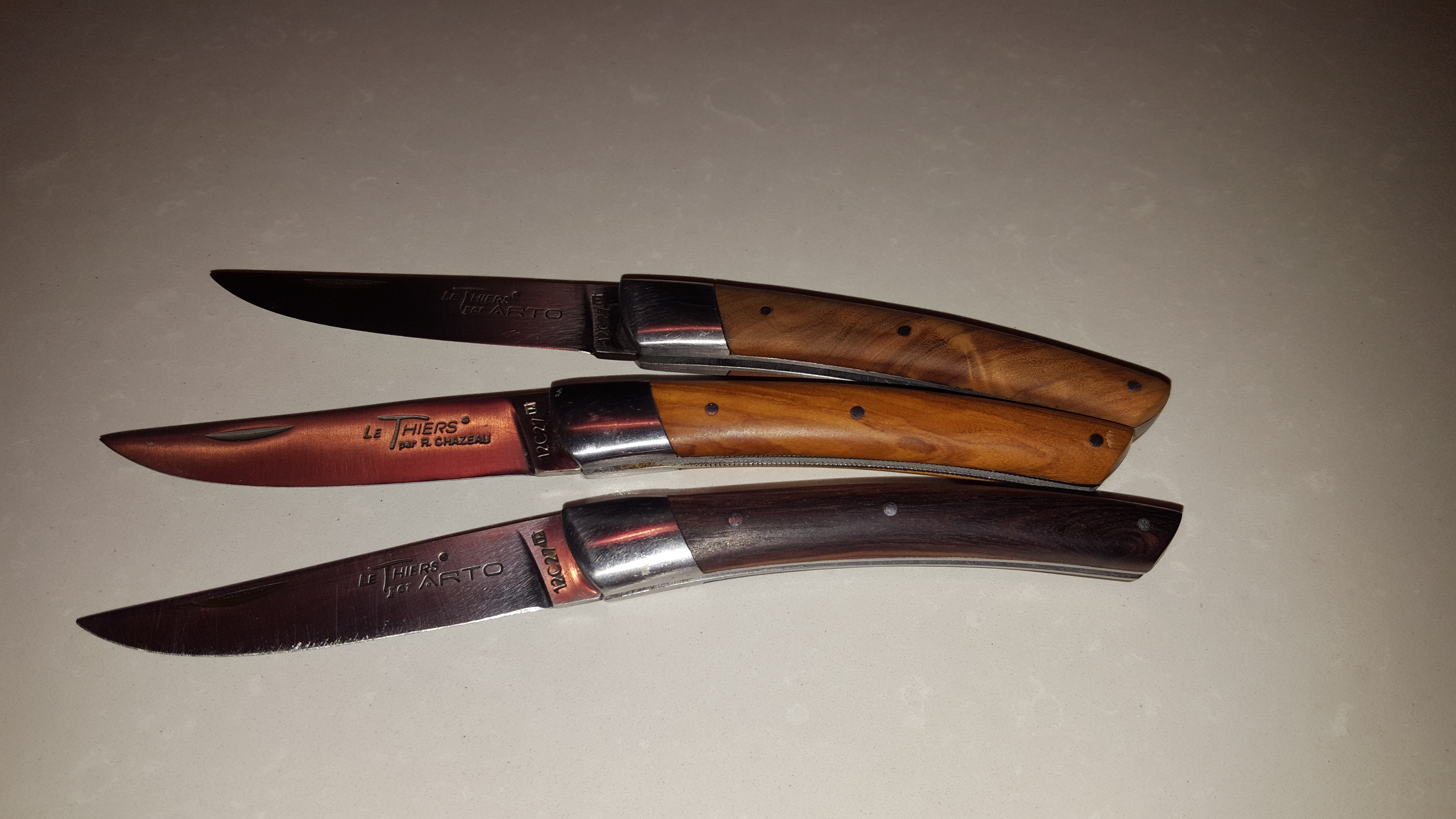
Le Thiers knives made entirely in Thiers.

The cutlery of Thiers, a specialized tradition in the Thiers region of the Puy-de-Dôme department, Auvergne-Rhône-Alpes, France, is supported by the presence of the Durolle River and local forests.

Cutlery production in Thiers, first documented in the 13th century, has significantly contributed to the region's national and international reputation in artisanal and industrial sectors. By the 17th century, Thiers merchants exported cutlery beyond France. During the 19th-century Industrial Revolution, production became industrialized. In the early 20th century, cutlers transitioned from using the Durolle River's mechanical power to electricity. By 2016, Thiers accounted for 80% of France's annual knife production, remaining the largest cutlery production center in the European Union and earning the title "capital of cutlery," despite facing industrial challenges and requiring state support.

In 2020, cutlery was the sector with the highest number of jobs in the Thiers region. In 2016, the Chamber of Commerce and Industry estimated that the cutlery industry in the city of Thiers employed over 2,000 people. The large proportion of workers residing in the municipality is largely explained by this factor.

== Geographic origins ==
In the 15th century, cutlery workshops were established along the Durolle River in Thiers, utilizing water-powered "rouets" (grinding workshops) from the Moûtier district upstream to the Thiers mountains, in areas later known as the Valleys of the Factories and the Rouets. The "parceling out of work" system distributed knife production across multiple sites, leading to the establishment of manufacturing workshops in the medieval city center and nearby villages.

During the Trente Glorieuses (France's post-war economic boom), cutlery workshops and factories began relocating from the Durolle gorges to new facilities in Thiers' lower city. From the 1980s, this expansion included the development of industrial zones, Felet and Racine, near the A89 motorway exits.

Map of the Vallée des Usines and the medieval town of Thiers, the region's main knife production sites.

== History ==
=== Origins ===
The south-western part of the Vallée des Usines in 2018.

The hydraulic power of the Durolle was used in Thiers as early as the Middle Ages to power flour mills, fulling mills for tanners, hammers for papermakers, and, with the development of cutlery, tilt hammers for metalworkers and grindstones for sharpeners. According to legend, crusaders from Auvergne brought back from the East the secret of steelmaking—specifically, the carburizing process. By the 15th century, one quarter of Thiers' workers were cutlers. The objects produced in Thiers were exported to several countries as early as the 17th century: Spain, Italy, Germany, Turkey, and "the Indies." (Note: Legrand d’Aussy noted in his 1788 book Voyage en Auvergne that industrialists from Thiers were effectively competing against English manufacturers even in the Indies.)

=== Material sourcing ===
The cutlery industry in Thiers developed primarily due to the Durolle River's hydraulic power and a substantial local workforce. From the Middle Ages, most materials, except wood for knife handles sourced from local forests like Bois Noirs in the Thiers mountains, were imported. Coal was obtained from Saint-Éloy-les-Mines and Brassac-les-Mines in Puy-de-Dôme, while iron and steel were sourced from Nivernais, Burgundy, and Dauphiné. Grindstones were supplied from Langeac quarries and, from the 19th century, the Vosges region.

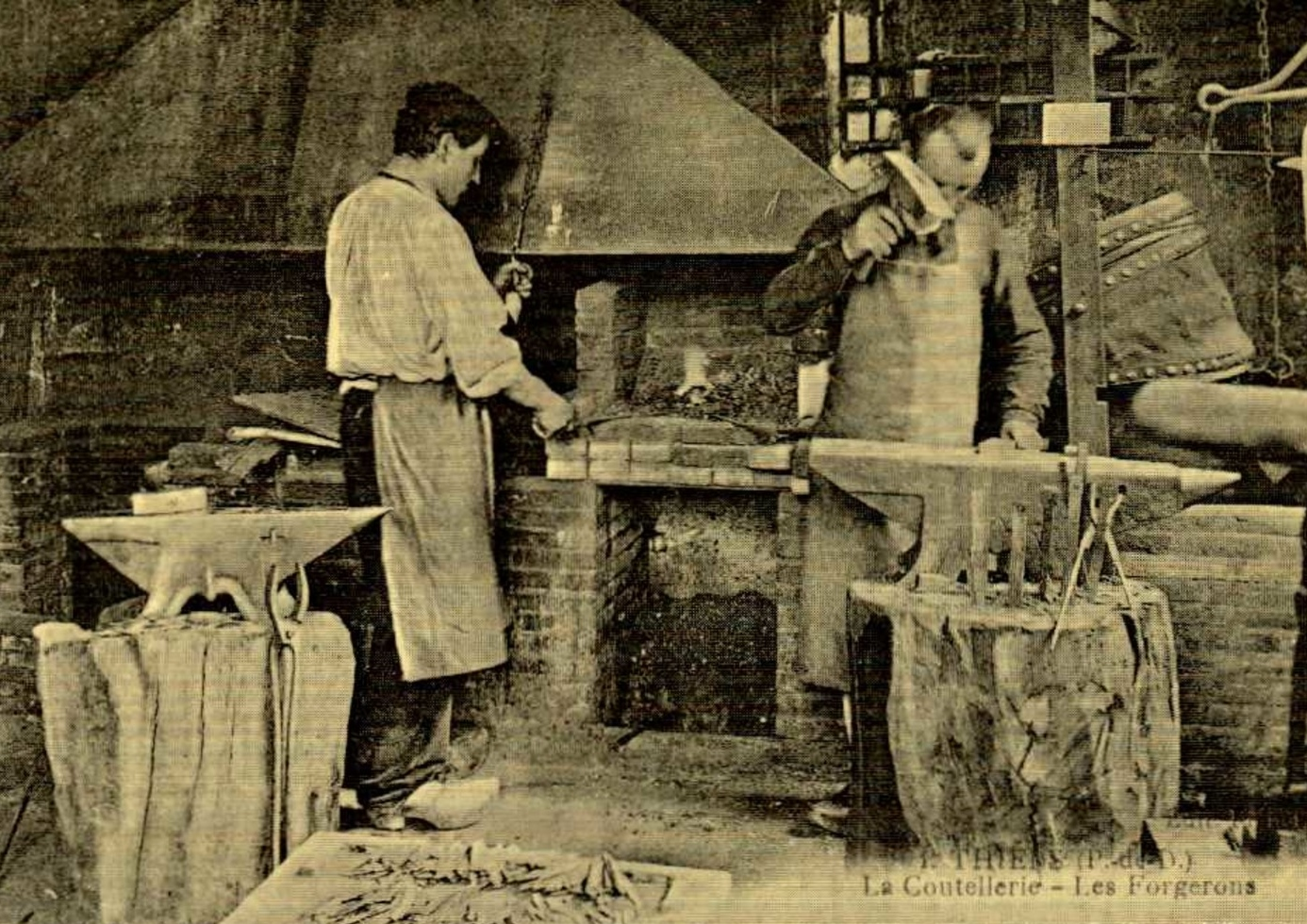
Thiers blacksmiths in their workshop.

=== Organization of the cutlers of Thiers ===
Since the 15th century, Thiers' cutlers adopted a labor division system to enhance production efficiency. Knife manufacturing was distributed across the town, with workers specializing in specific tasks, often passed down through generations, fostering high skill levels. Steel bars were first processed by "martinaires," who thinned them using trip hammers powered by the Durolle River. Blacksmiths then forged the knife components, which were subsequently handled by filers, drillers, grinders, and polishers, who sharpened and polished blades on river-driven grindstones. Manufacturers tempered the blades, while handle-makers provided handles. Final assembly was typically performed by workers in Thiers' suburbs.

=== Marketing of knives ===
The Thiers coat of arms, symbolized by a three-masted ship, represents the commercial power of Thiers merchants, particularly in the cutlery, paper, and tanning industries.

From the 17th century, Thiers' cutlers employed two primary marketing channels for their knives. Direct sales occurred through cutlery shops established in the medieval city's narrow streets, serving both locals and visitors. Recognizing the potential of the national market, Thiers' high-quality knives were also sold to affluent customers in major French cities such as Lyon, Paris, and Bordeaux. By the 18th century, Thiers expanded into international markets, with merchants gaining prominence in Spain, Italy, and regions referred to as the Indies. The knife trade significantly contributed to Thiers' economic growth, supporting a population exceeding 10,000 by the 18th century and maintaining the region's artisanal vitality. Unlike other knife-producing centers that focused on local sales and were vulnerable to France's economic crises, Thiers' export-oriented approach ensured greater resilience.

=== Beginning of the Thiers industry ===
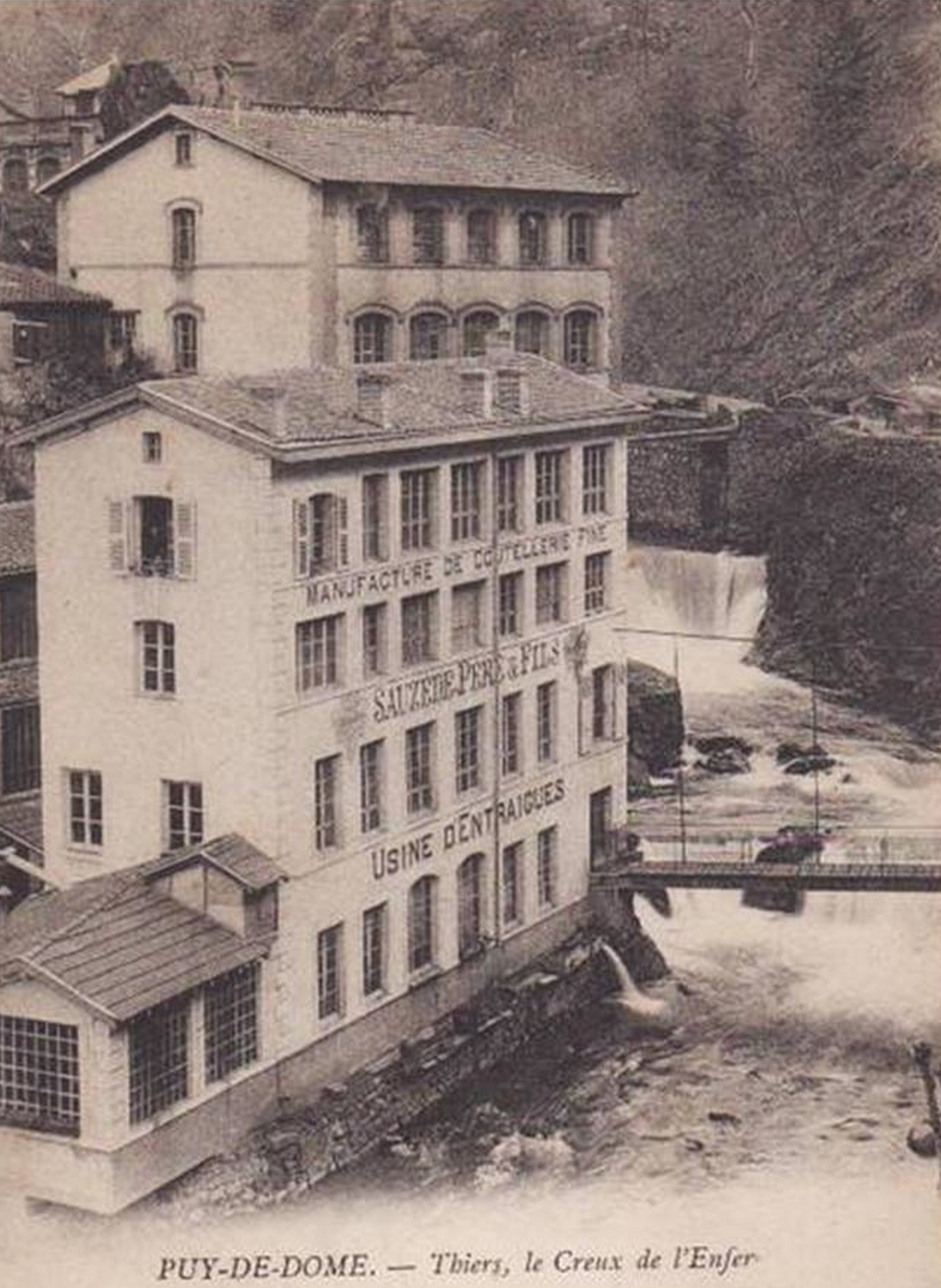
The Entraygues and Creux de l'enfer factories in the early 1930s.

From 1850, the cutlery industry in Thiers adapted to mechanization, enabling its survival and growth while foreshadowing large-scale industrialization. In contrast, paper mills and tanneries, which resisted mechanization, faced declining competitiveness against English and German rivals. By 1860, only about twenty paper mills remained in Thiers, disappearing entirely by the eve of World War I. By the late 19th century, foreign competition prompted Thiers' cutlery industries to modernize through electrification, leading to the development of integrated factories that encompassed all stages of knife production.

During France's Industrial Revolution, which often prioritized mechanization over craftsmanship, Thiers preserved its artisanal expertise in cutlery production. The Durolle River gorges were divided into two valleys. Upstream, the Vallée des Rouets, part of the cutlery museum, opened to visitors in 1998 and maintained traditional artisanal methods using river-powered grinding wheels. Downstream, from 1860, large electrified factories, established after 1900, were constructed along the Durolle's narrow banks in Thiers' lower town.

=== Working conditions ===
Since the Middle Ages, working conditions in the cutlery industry have been characterized by significant physical hardship and occupational hazards. Grinders, in particular, worked in a prone position to sharpen blades more efficiently, a method that increased productivity but also involved considerable risk. Grindstones, often powered at high speeds by the Durolle River, could shatter violently, with fatal consequences for nearby workers. Environmental conditions in the workshops were also challenging. Located in the gorges of the Durolle, the sites were subject to low temperatures and persistent humidity. In metalworking shops, ambient temperatures could exceed 50 °C, and high humidity was constant. Workers operated powerful machinery, including trip hammers, steam hammers, and cutting presses, which posed serious risks in the event of inattention or malfunction. High noise levels and poor air quality, due in part to coal dust from furnace heating, further contributed to the harshness of the working environment.

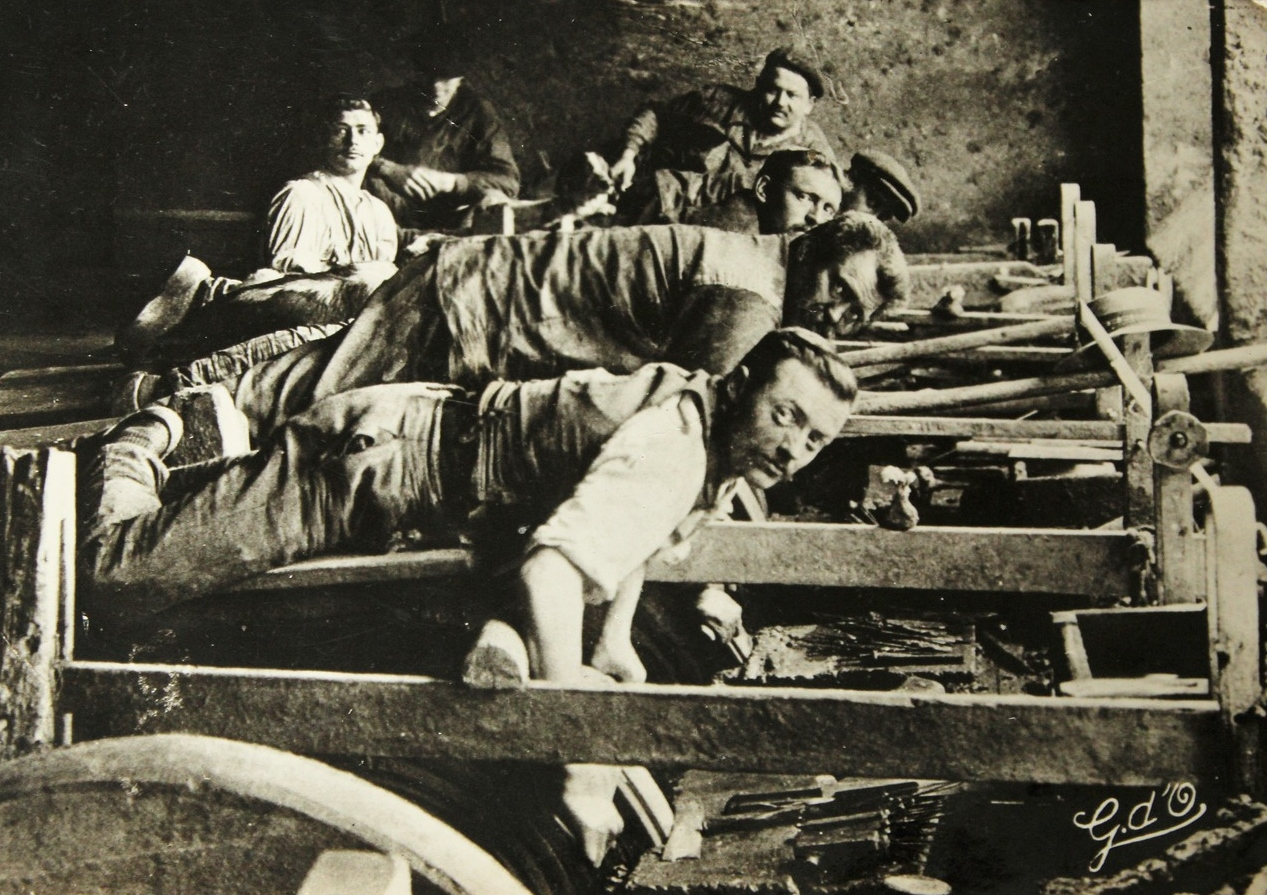

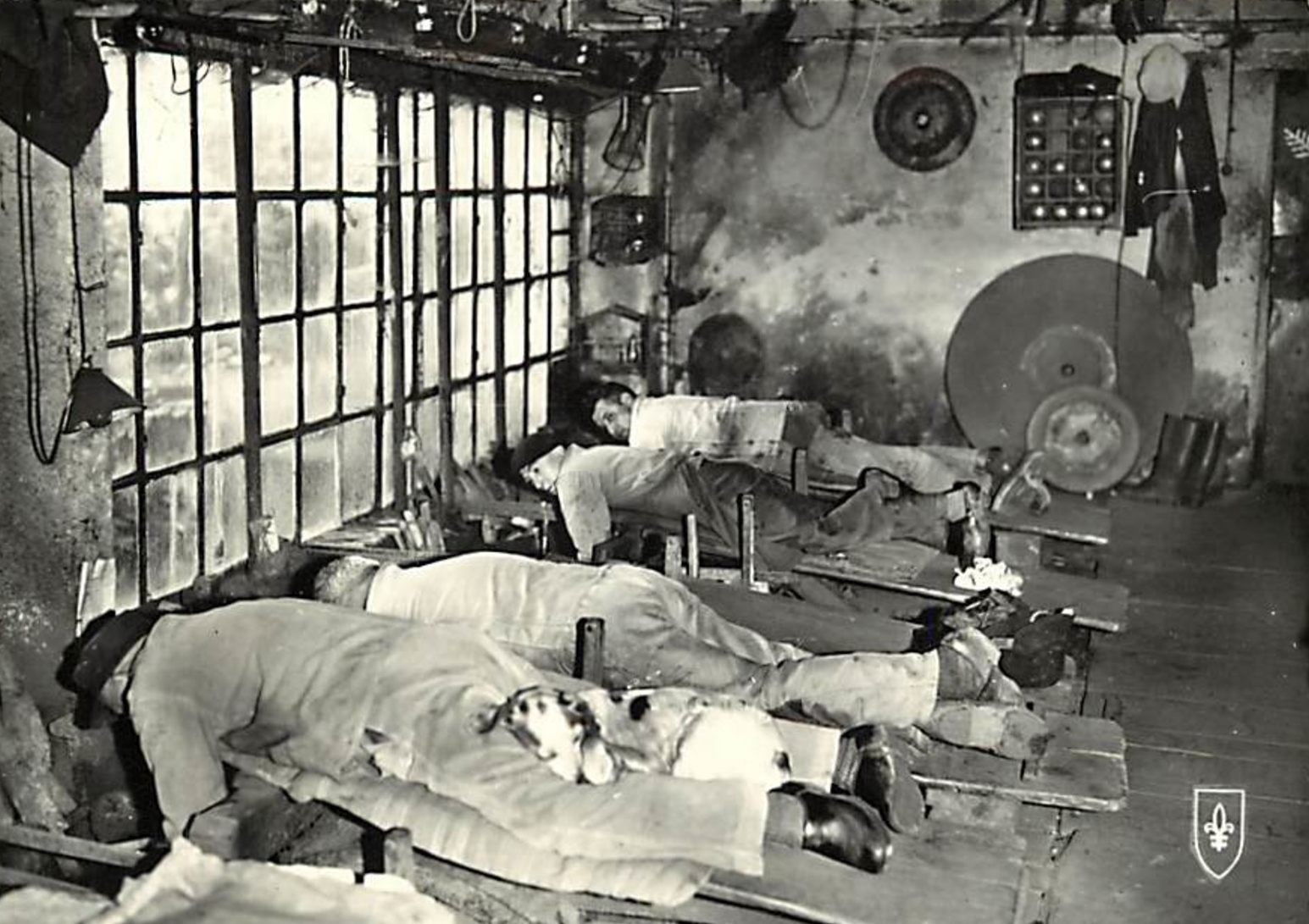

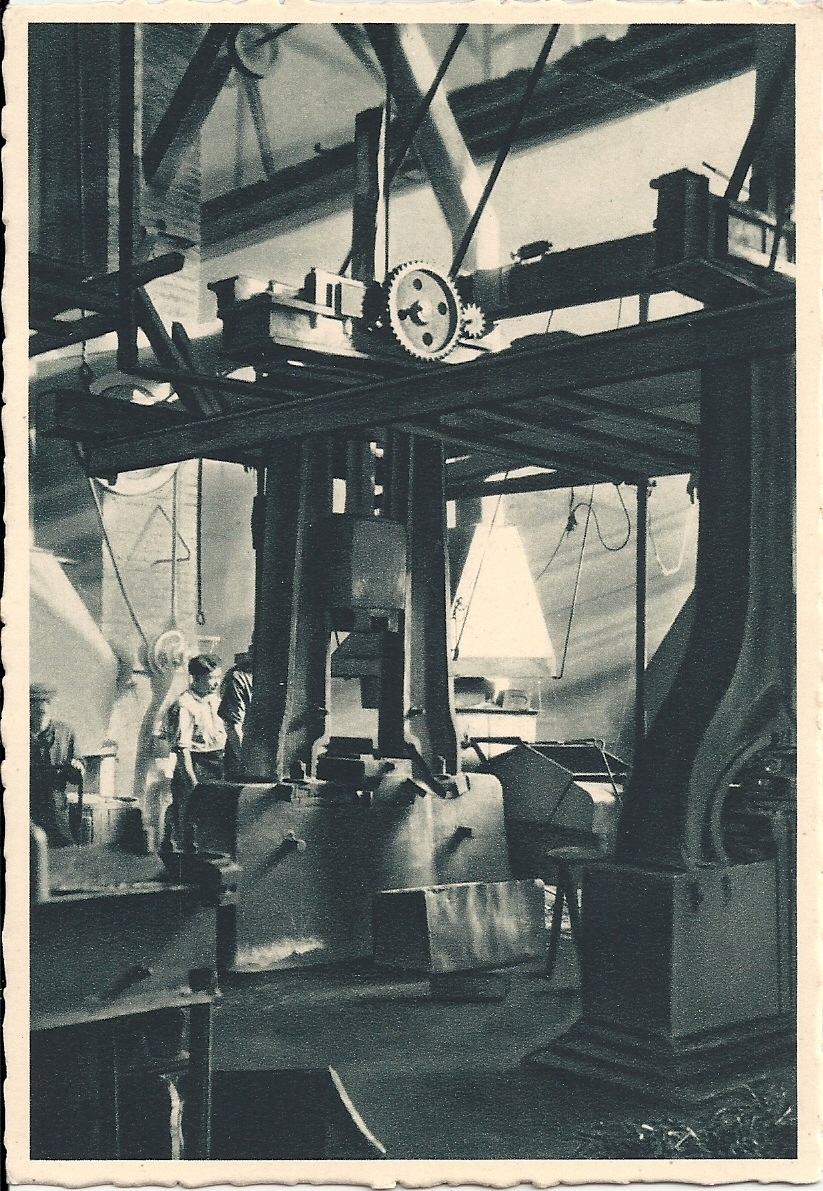

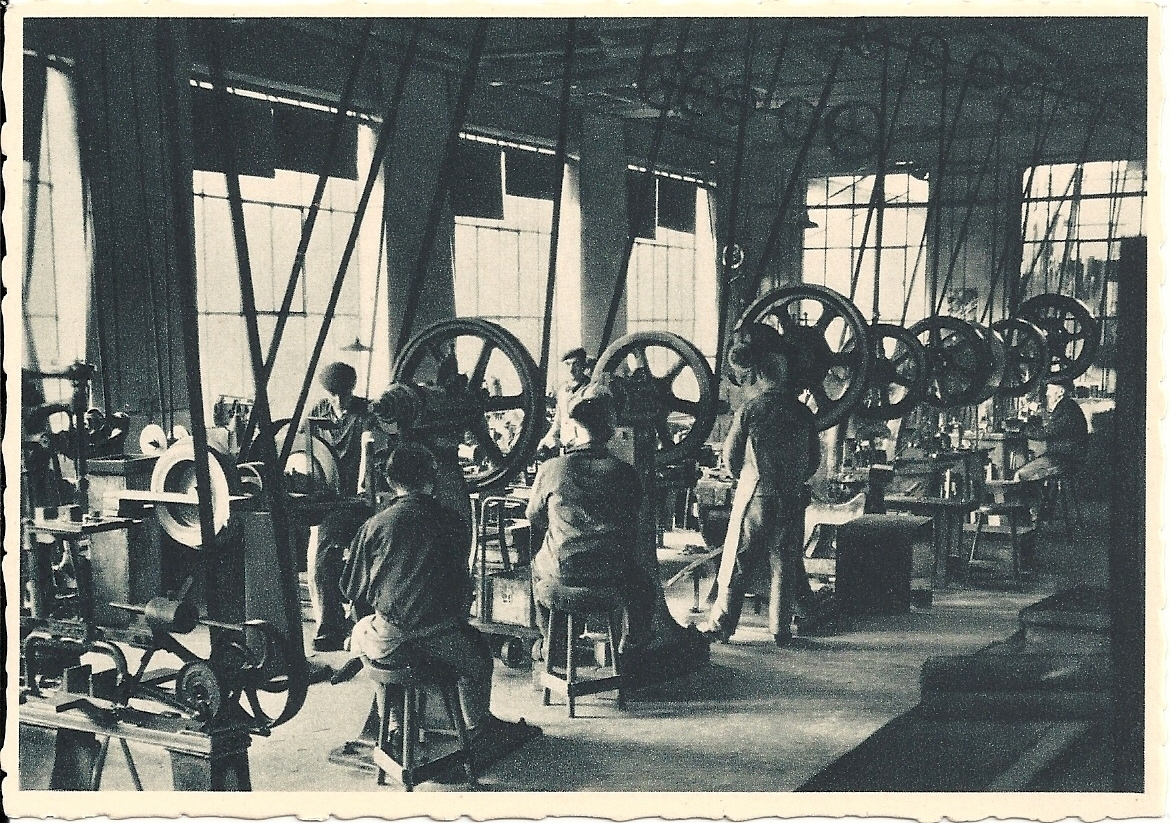

=== Economic crises of the 20th century and production fluctuations ===
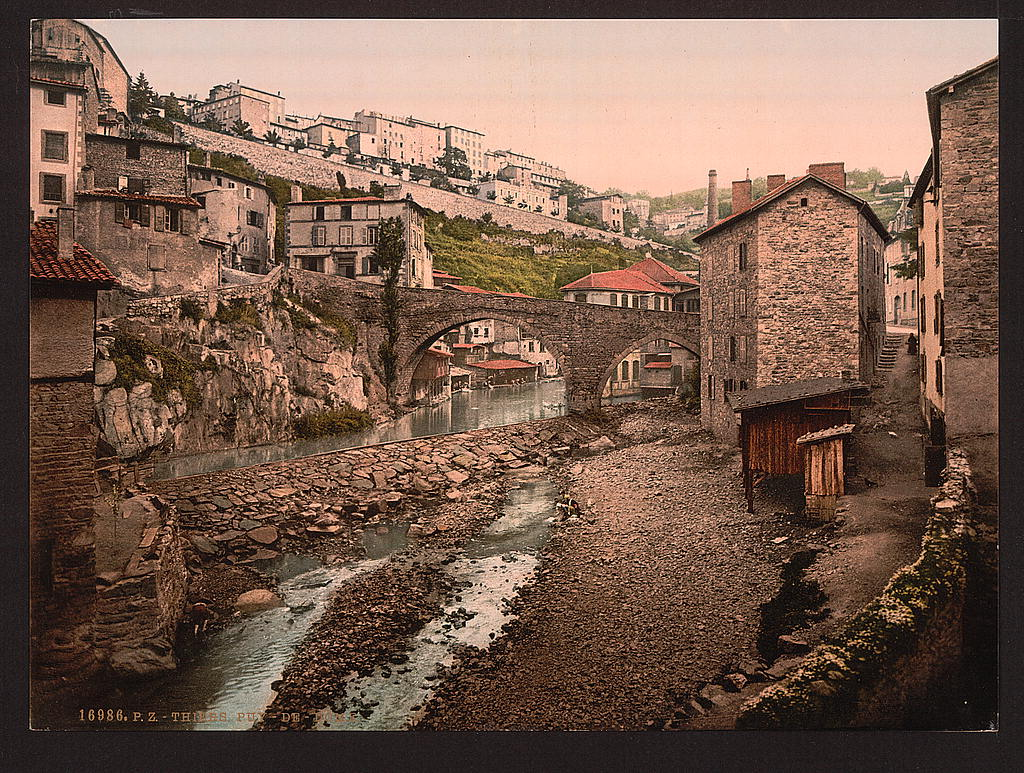
The northern part of the factory valley in the early 20th century.

==== Issues related to water use ====
At the beginning of the 20th century, issues related to the flow of the Durolle River became increasingly significant for the industrial operations in Thiers. During the summer months, the river's flow was low and irregular, limiting the operation of factories dependent on its kinetic energy and leading to periods of underemployment. In contrast, winter brought frequent flooding, as the river became a powerful torrent. Thiers was among the most flood-prone towns in the Puy-de-Dôme department, with the Vallée des Usines being particularly affected.

To reduce dependence on the river, factories began transitioning to electric power in 1903. By 1920, the Durolle supplied an average of approximately 1,000 horsepower per day, while electric power provided around 1,500 horsepower.

This shift allowed local factories to operate more consistently and to function as fully integrated industrial facilities:

Year	Horsepower
1903	170
1908	803
1914	1,123
1920	1,200

In 1912, the Durolle Valley employed over 12,000 workers and was home to approximately 550 manufacturers. At that time, the Thiers basin was the leading center for knife and bladed-tool production in France, surpassing other hubs such as Châtellerault, Nogent-en-Bassigny, and Paris, and comparable in scale to Sheffield in the United Kingdom. However, production levels began to fluctuate in the years that followed.

Year	Production in tons
1912	3,108 t
1918	1,210 t
1920	2,618 t

=== Post-war reconstruction ===
Although Thiers remained the leading cutlery production center in France during the 1930s, the post-World War II reconstruction period saw the emergence of numerous small enterprises. Many workers became self-employed, establishing micro-enterprises that operated alongside the city's larger factories. These small businesses typically employed only a few individuals, often within a family structure. Business owners commonly worked alongside employees in the workshops, while administrative tasks were frequently managed by family members. Workplace relations in these enterprises were generally informal, reflecting the small scale and familial nature of the operations.

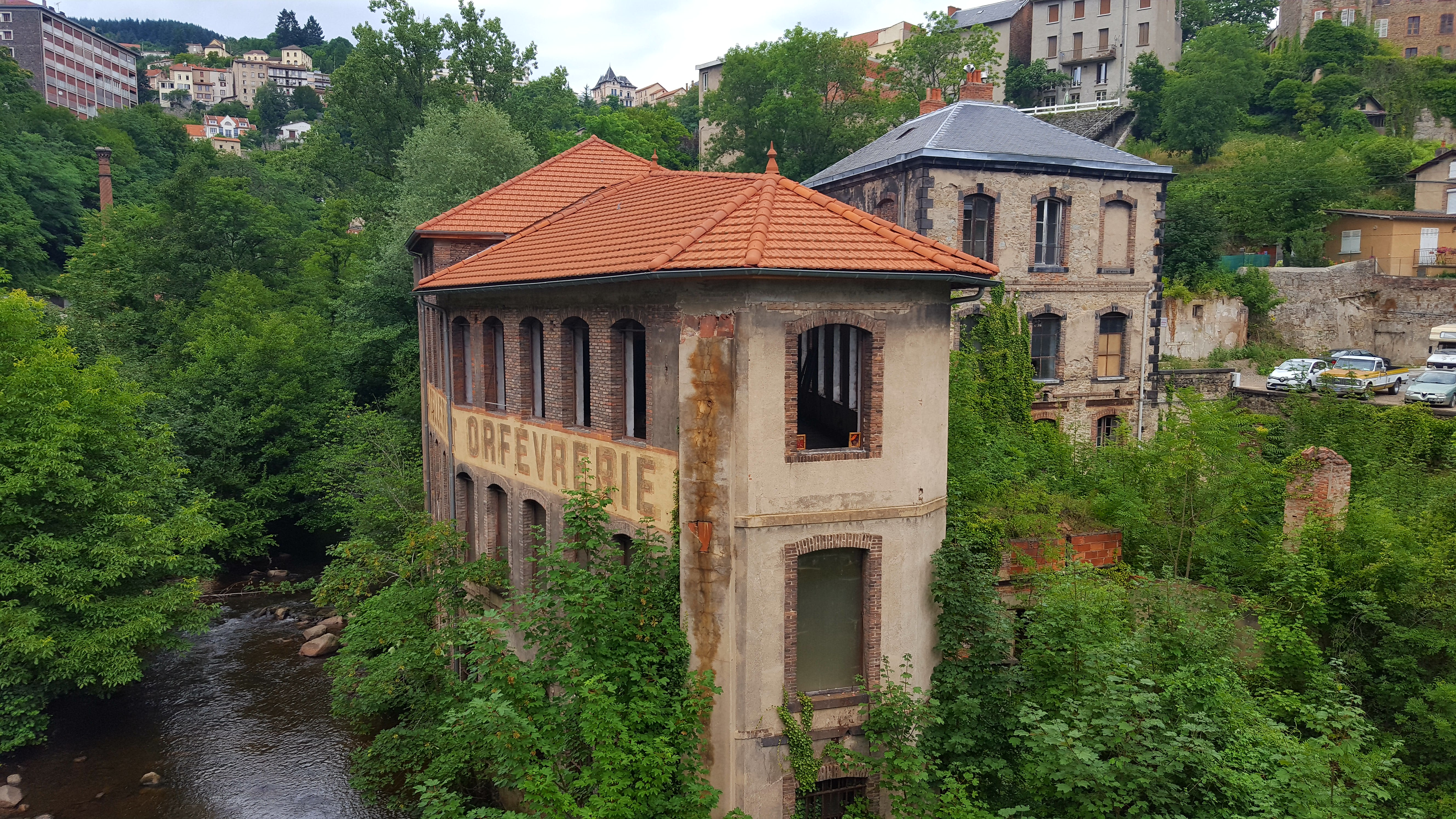
The former Seychalles bridge factory, also known as Société générale de coutellerie et orfèvrerie, taken over in July 2017.

Knife production in Thiers continued to grow until the early 1970s. Following the end of World War II, factories such as those at Creux de l’Enfer and Le May resumed operations. During this period, Thiers developed a predominantly cutlery-based economy, with the cutlery industry becoming a central component of the city's economic structure.

=== End of the Thirty Glorious Years ===
From the early 1970s to the early 2010s, employment in the cutlery industry in Thiers experienced a steady decline. While the sector employed approximately 9,000 people in the early 1970s, this number had decreased to around 3,000 by the early 2000s. Beginning in the 1980s, increased foreign competition—particularly from low-cost Asian manufacturers—led to the permanent closure of many local companies, posing significant challenges for the Thiers cutlery industry.

By the late 20th century, cutlery factories in Thiers underwent further modernization, and the Durolle River ceased to be used as an energy source, having been fully replaced by electricity. Beginning in the 1960s, many companies relocated from the Vallée des Usines to newly developed industrial zones. By 2020, the valley contained numerous industrial brownfields. Some former factory sites, such as Le May and Creux de l’Enfer, were repurposed as museums or contemporary art centers, while others, including Ferrier Usinage and Pont de Seychalles, were left abandoned.

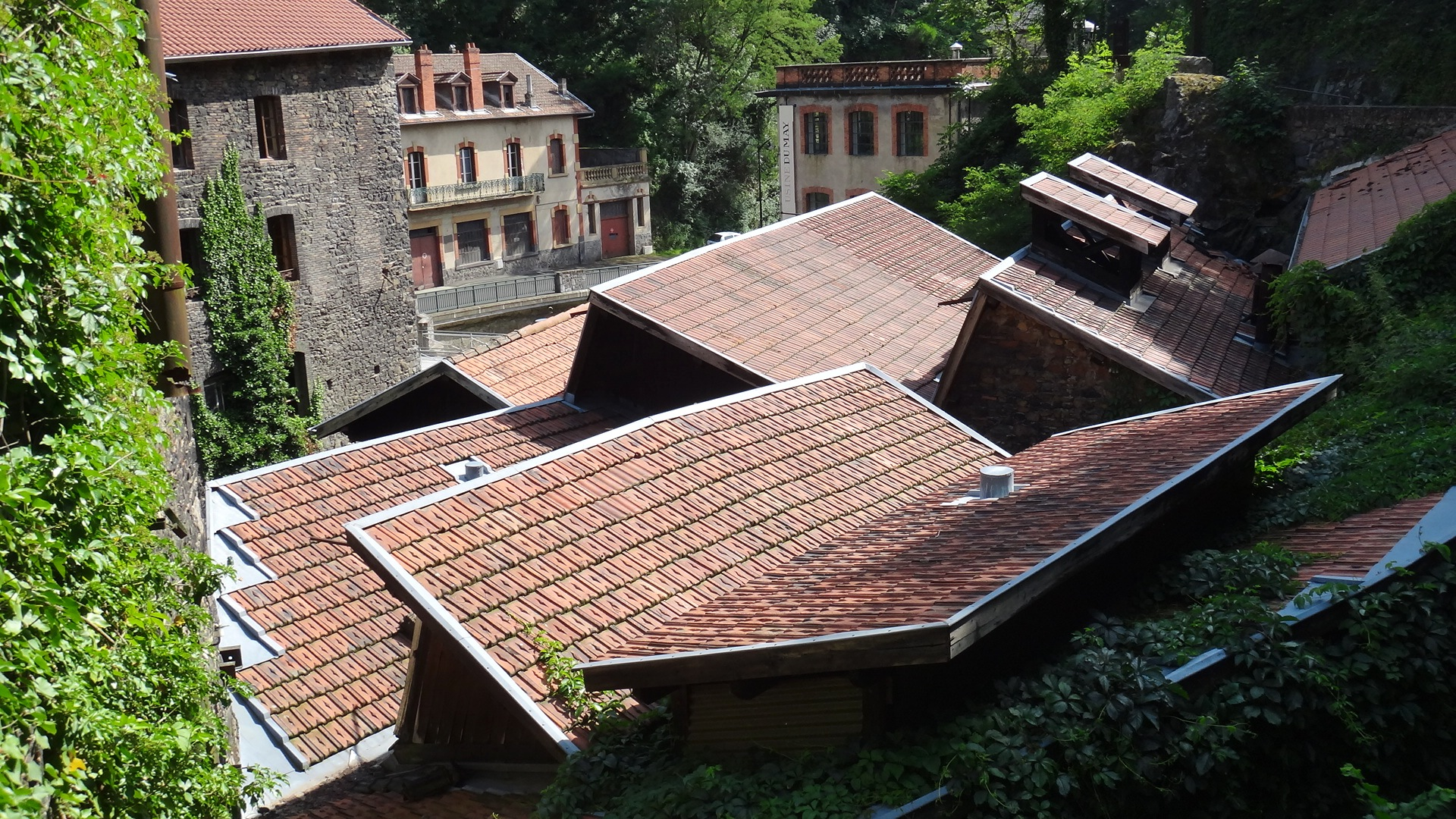

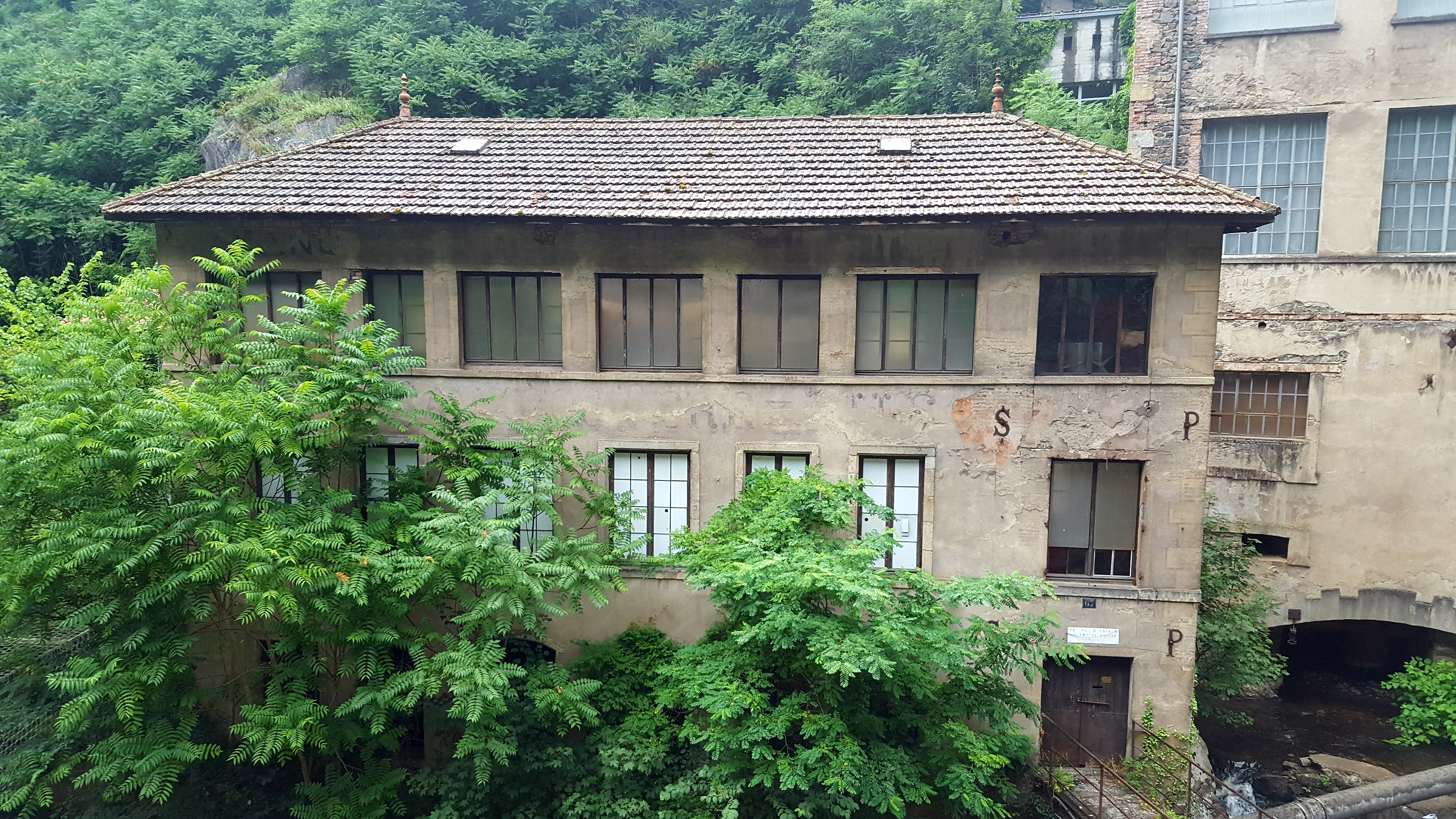

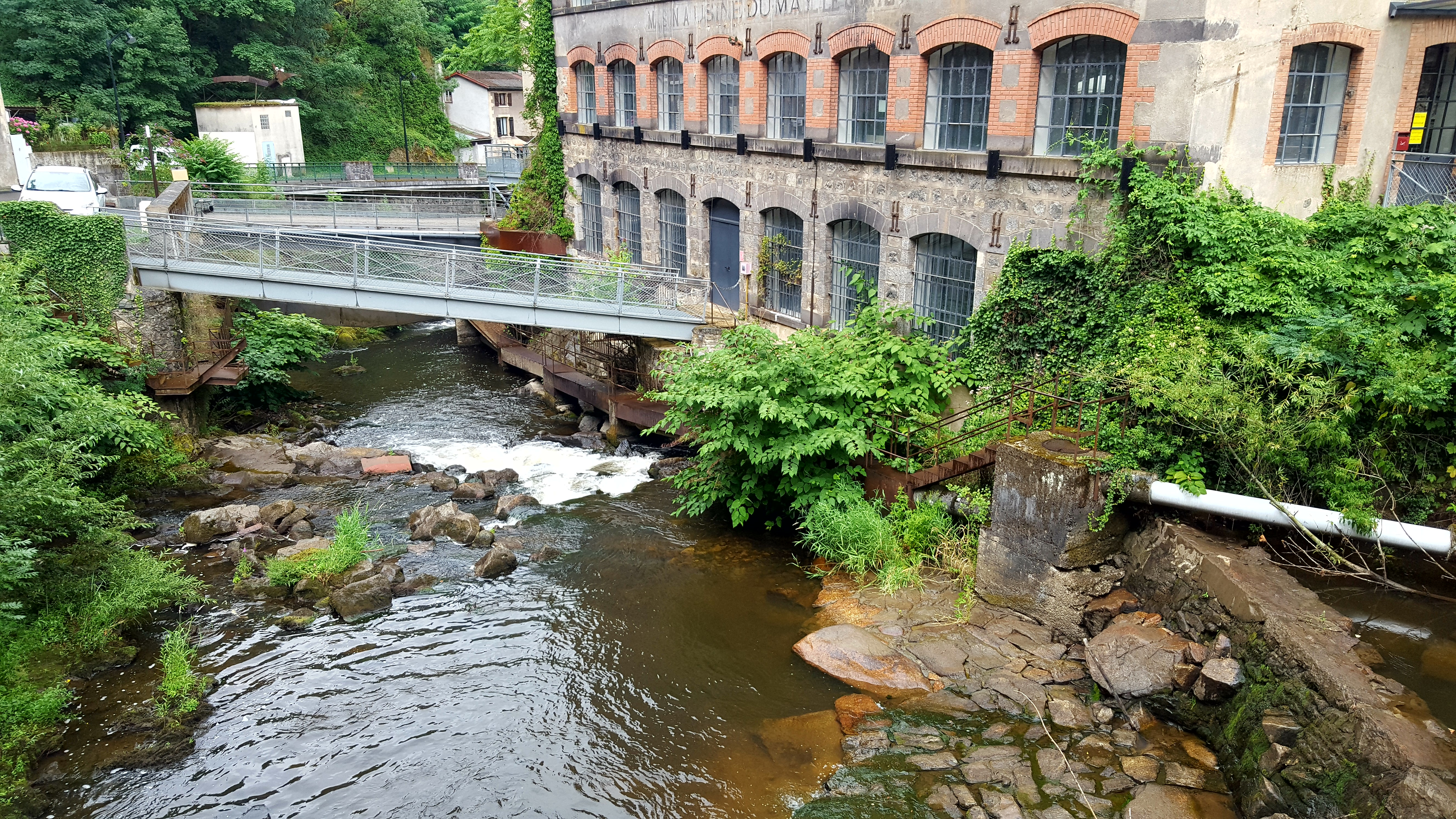

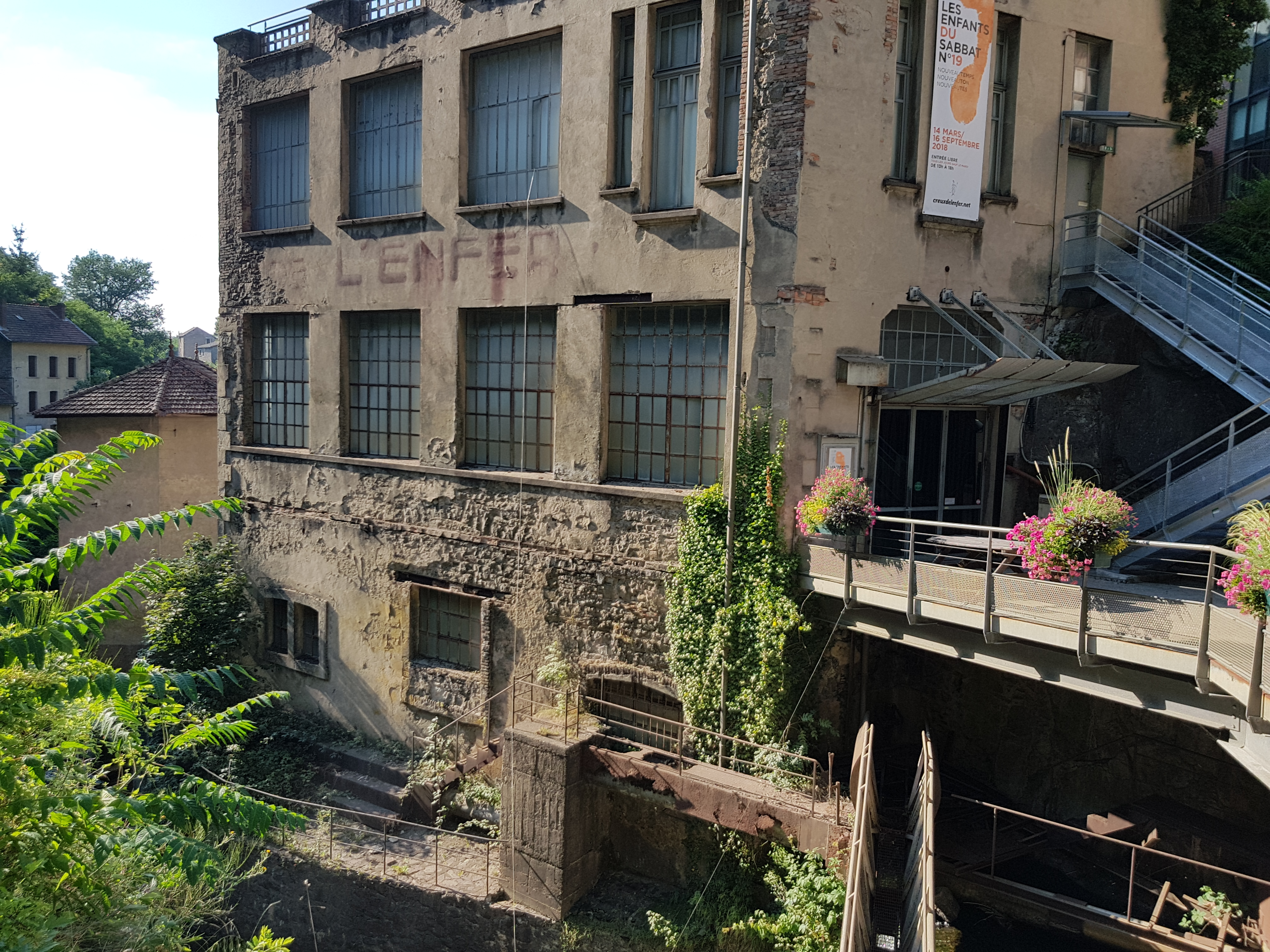

== Manufacturing ==
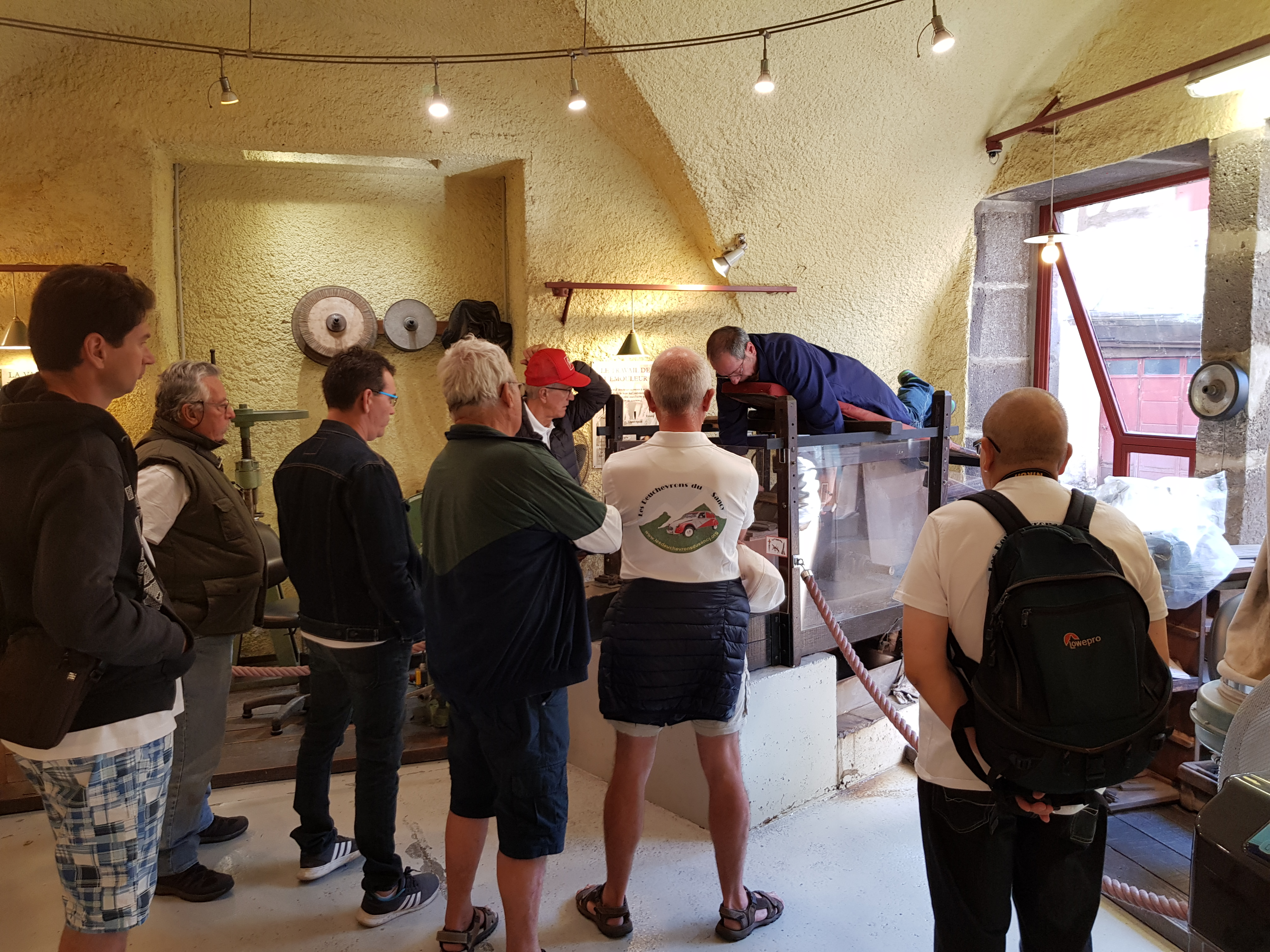
A cutler grinding a knife at the Musée de la Coutellerie in Thiers.

Knife production in Thiers involves multiple stages that incorporate both traditional and modern techniques. The process begins with the selection of steel for the stainless blade, chosen for its cutting performance. This is followed by cutting, which may be performed using mechanical tools, digital laser technology, or stamping methods. Subsequent steps include grinding to form the blade's edge, heat treatment, and quenching to enhance durability and sharpness.

To complete the knife, materials for the handle are selected, which may include wood, corneous, ivory, mammoth tooth, synthetic materials, or metal.

Once both the blade and handle are prepared, assembly and fitting are carried out by hand, particularly within the Confrérie du couteau Le Thiers (Brotherhood of the Le Thiers Knife). The final steps include polishing to achieve the knife's finished appearance, followed by marking and sharpening.

== Role of cutlery in Thiers society ==
=== A sector in crisis at the beginning of the 21st Century ===
Thiers remains the leading center of cutlery production in France, despite a general decline in output during the second half of the 20th century. As of 2015, the Chamber of Commerce and Industry recorded 78 cutlery manufacturers in the Thiers district, employing 852 people directly and nearly 2,000 indirectly. Additionally, 34 artisan cutlers operate in the area. Thiers accounts for 94% of cutlery-related establishments and 99% of employment in the Auvergne region. Cutlery manufacturers represent 17% of all industrial establishments and 15% of industrial employment in the Thiers district. These companies are slightly larger than the regional average, with an average of 10.9 employees per establishment. Approximately half of the businesses have been in operation for over 20 years, and the majority are independent, with only 21% affiliated with industrial groups.

In 2013, approximately 30% of cutlery production in Thiers was exported. The sector experienced an increase in business closures and mergers of family-owned companies, largely due to competition from Southeast Asia and the outsourcing of industrial cutlery production. In response to these challenges, the French government introduced a territorial agreement in 2004 aimed at supporting companies in adapting to global competition. However, the effectiveness of this initiative, as well as that of the broader local production system, has remained limited. The entrepreneurial culture in Thiers, characterized by a strong emphasis on independence, has posed challenges to the development of collective territorial strategies. By 2005, several major cutlery firms in Thiers had already outsourced part of their production to China.

Despite a general decline in employment within the knife manufacturing sector in the Thiers district, the number of cutlery establishments increased slightly between 2009 and 2014.

During this period of industrial restructuring, the sector underwent significant transformation, supported by public initiatives. Since the 1990s, cutlery manufacturing has gradually been replaced by other branches of metallurgy. Activities that were previously subcontracted by the cutlery industry expanded through diversification beginning in the 1970s, extending their expertise to a broader range of industrial sectors.

Cutlery factories on industrial estates in Thiers

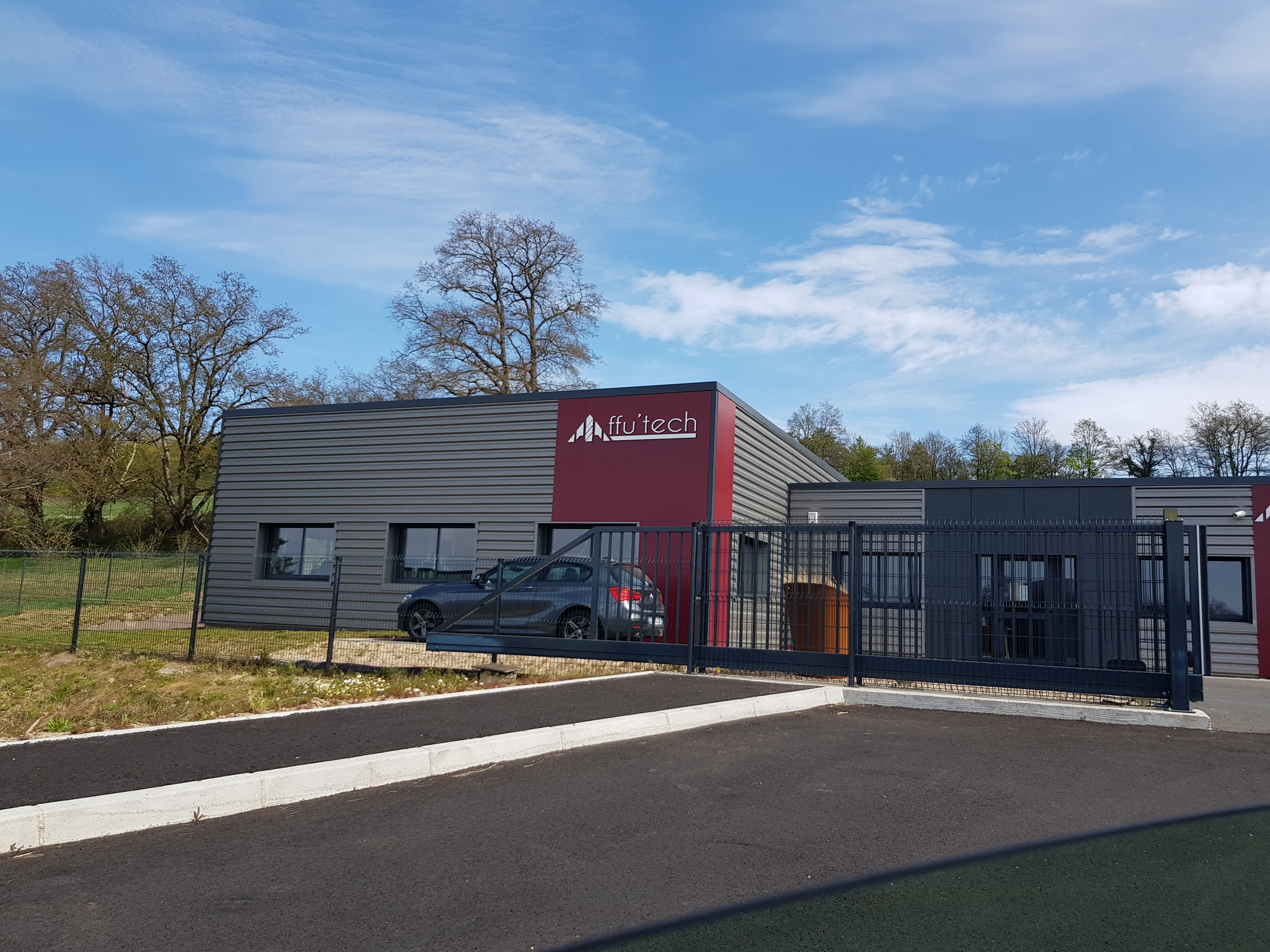

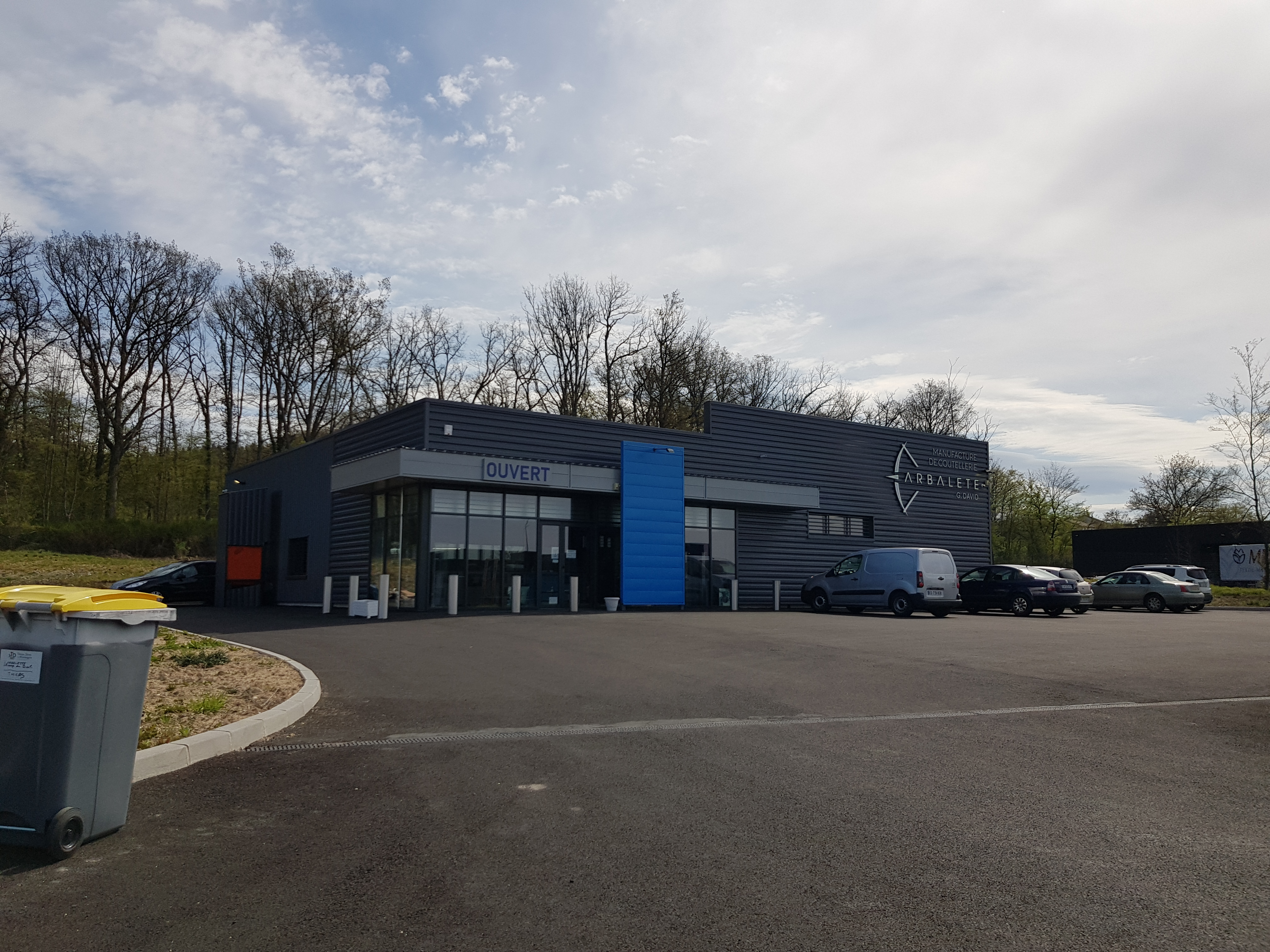

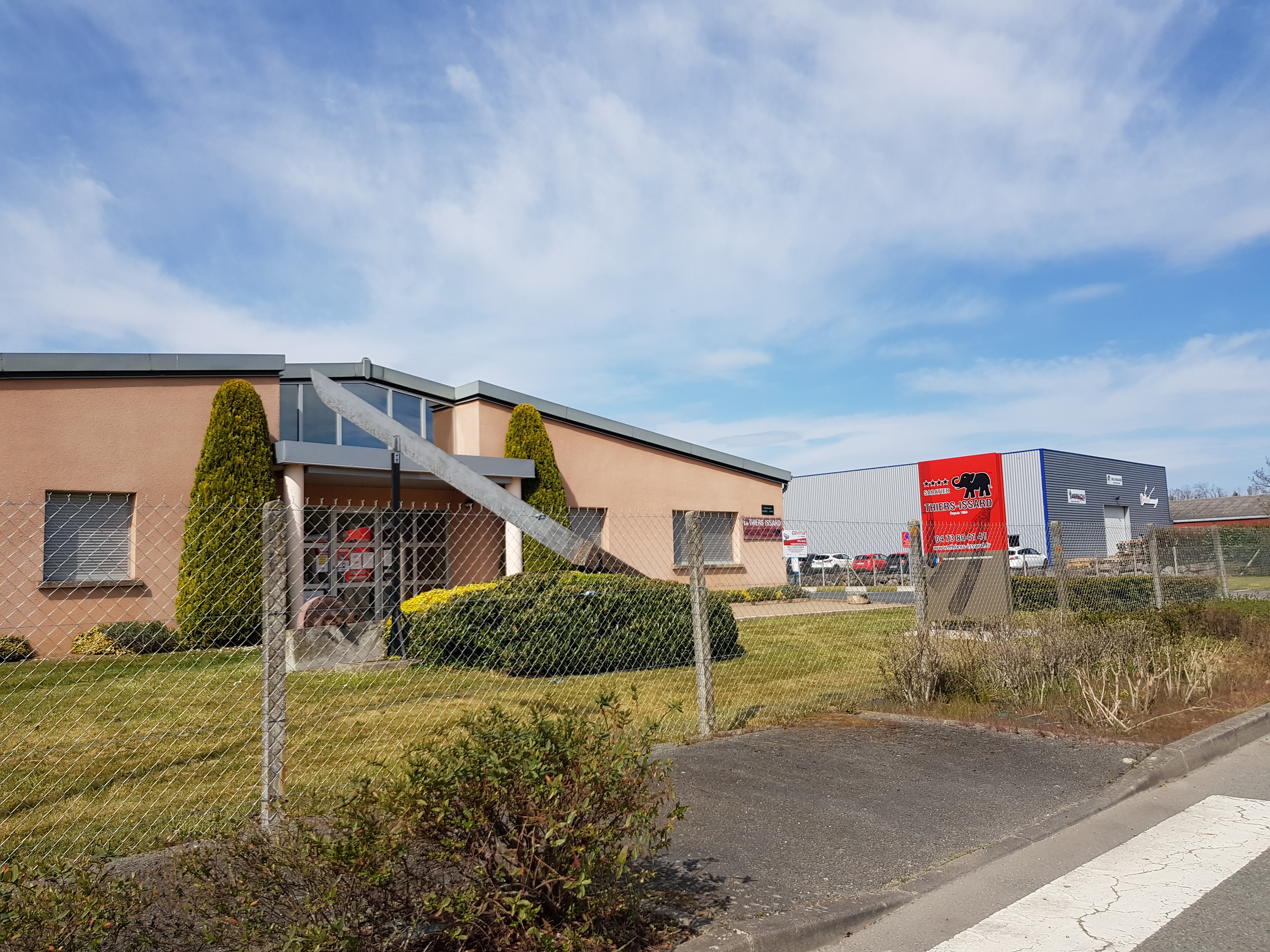

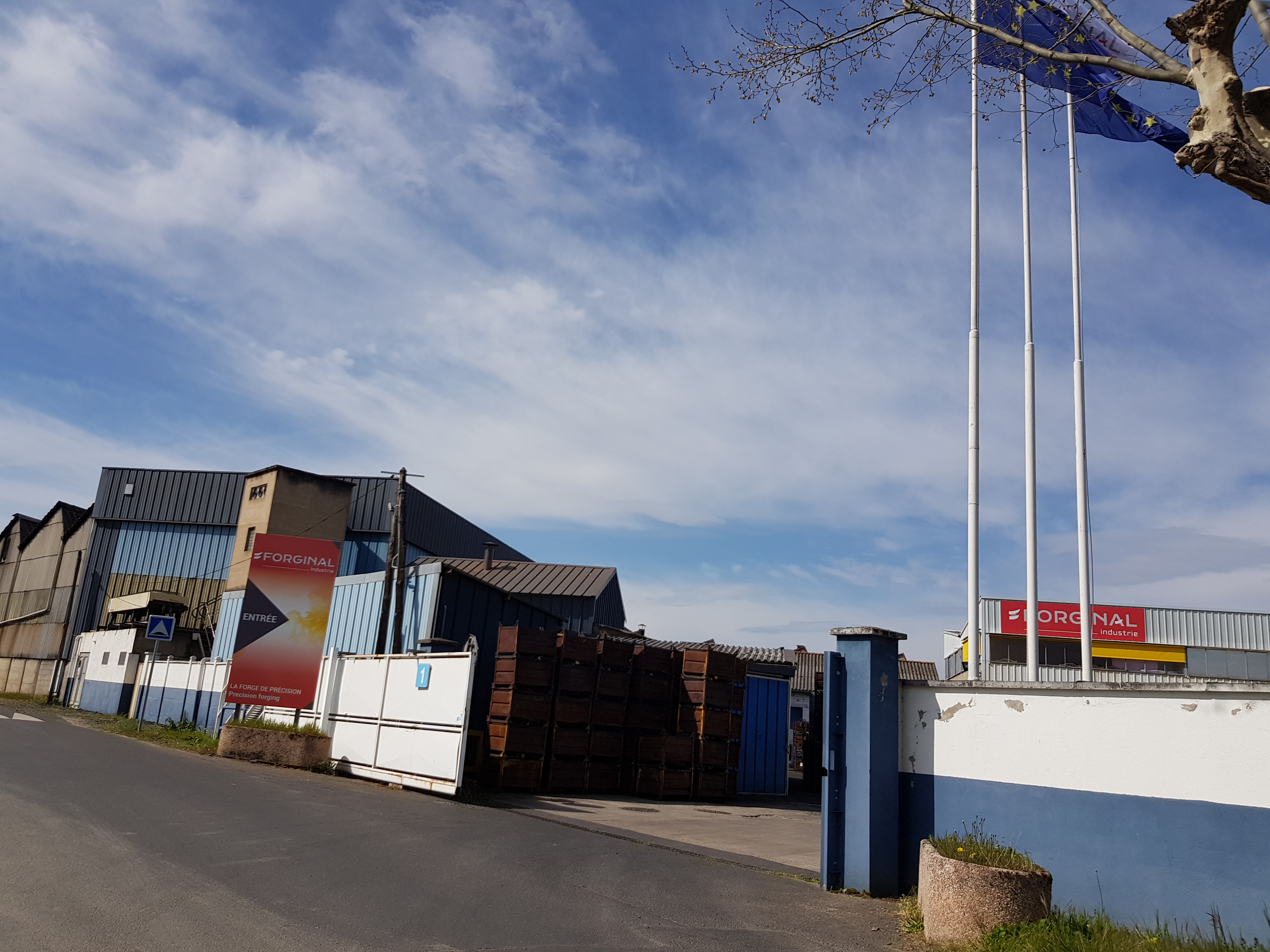

=== Promotion of artistic craftsmanship ===
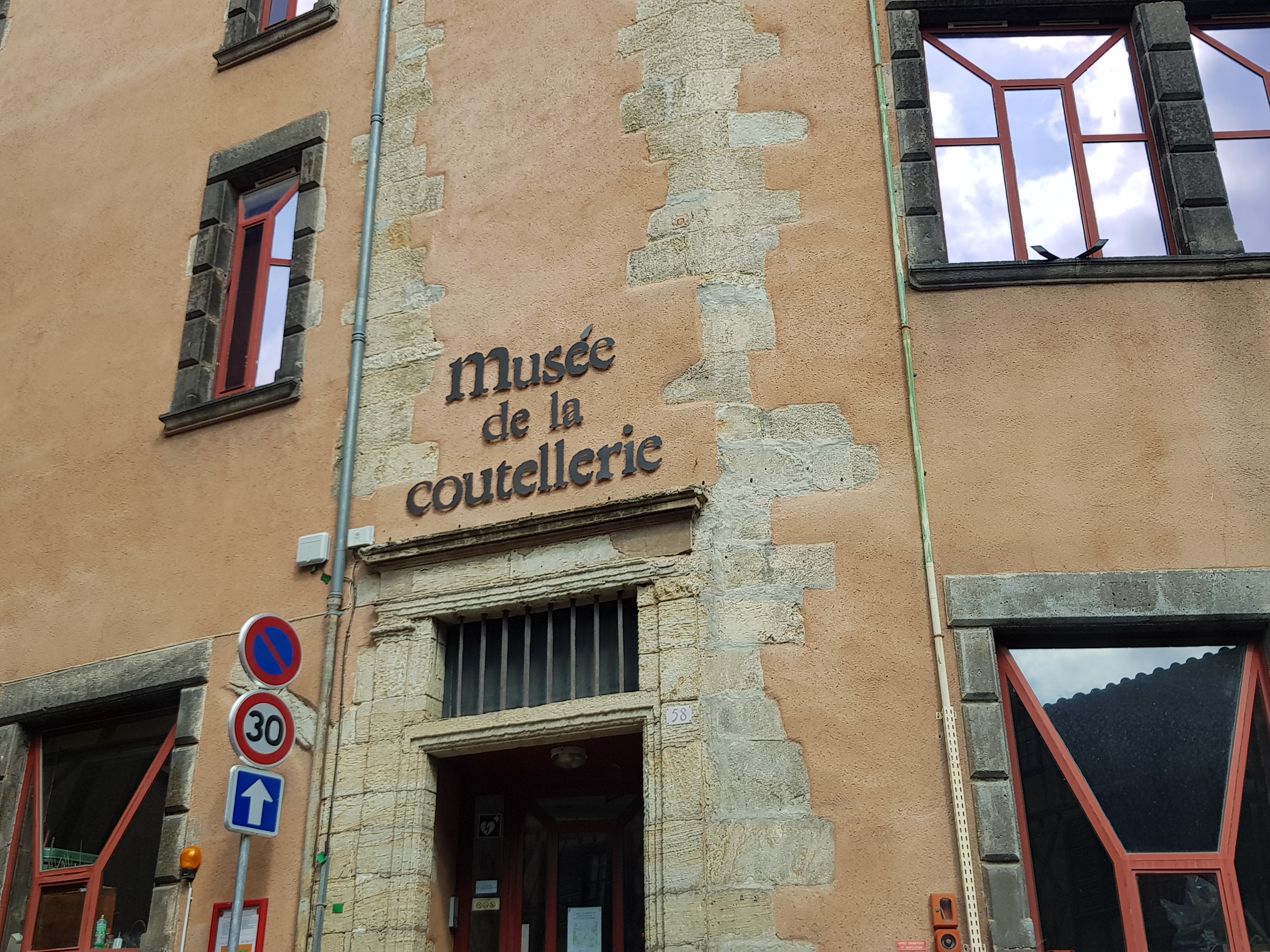
Part n°2 of the cutlery museum in 2017.

As of 2018, Thiers continued to produce approximately 80% of the knives consumed in France. However, production has increasingly shifted toward artistic and high-end craftsmanship. This trend is reflected in events such as the Coutellia Art and Tradition Knife Festival, which highlights the growing prominence of artisanal production. Thiers is also part of the "Ville et Métiers d’Art" (City and Crafts) network, which supports the establishment of artisan professionals in the area.

=== Image of a "knife‑making city" ===
The identity of Thiers is closely associated with knife making, and the town is often referred to by nicknames such as "Cutlery City" and "Thiers the Cutler." The international Coutellia Festival has further reinforced Thiers’ reputation as a center of cutlery production, contributing to its image as the "world capital of cutlery" and emphasizing its industrial heritage. The festival hosts approximately 230 artisan cutlers and knife-makers from 22 countries and attracts over 6,000 visitors annually. In 1993, a knife model named Le Thiers was created to represent the town's cutlery tradition. It has since become a symbol of Thiers and achieved commercial success, prompting many local manufacturers to develop their interpretations of the design.

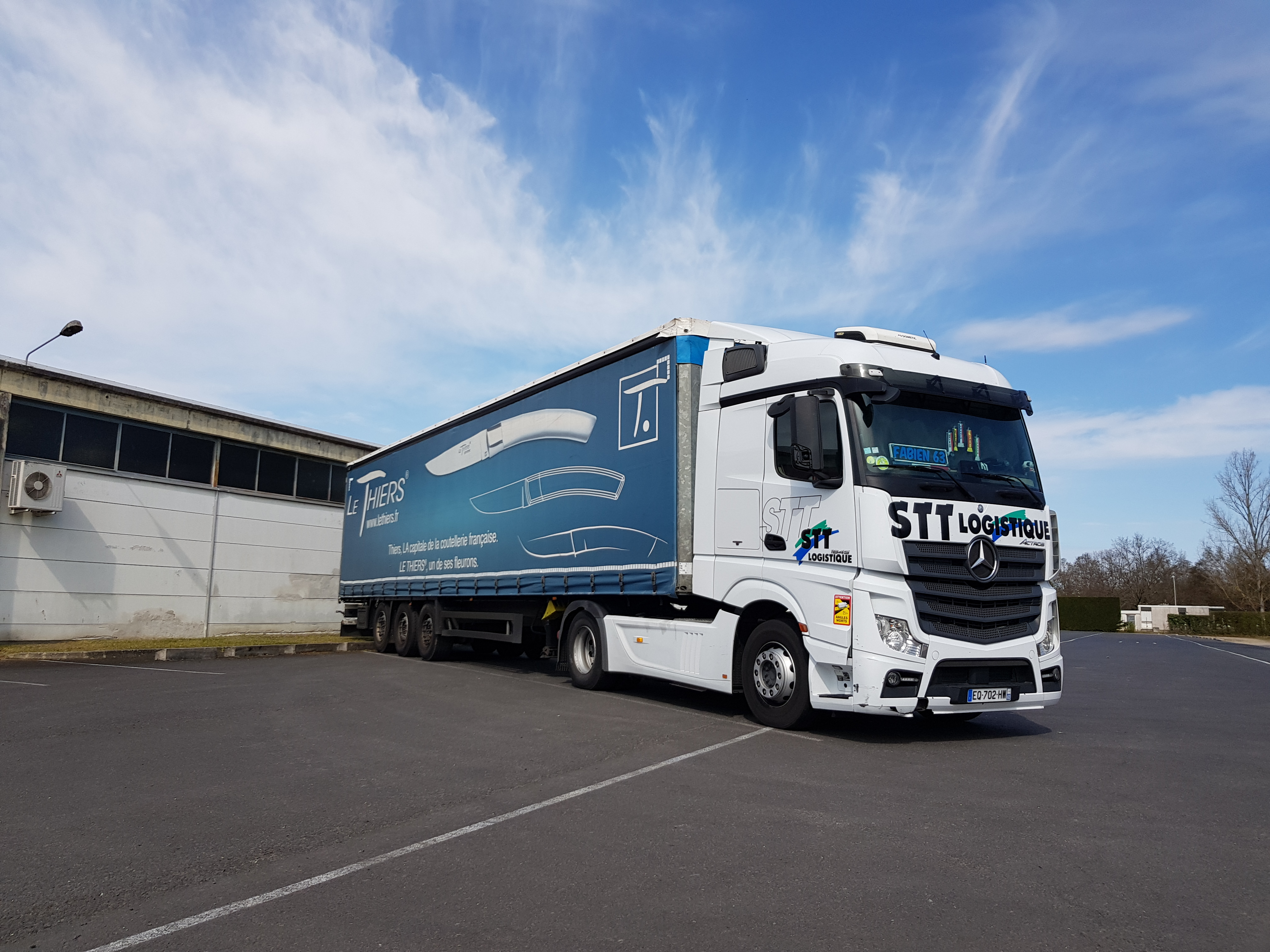
A truck parked in the parking lot of a Thiers factory boasting Thiers' status as the "cutlery capital" and promoting the Le Thiers knife.

To preserve and promote the cultural and industrial heritage of seven centuries of cutlery making, the municipality of Thiers established the Cutlery Museum in 1982. Located in the medieval center of the town, the museum became the fourth most visited in the former Auvergne region, attracting over 23,000 visitors in 2016.

Following the museum's creation, additional sites dedicated to the exhibition, production, and demonstration of cutlery-related activities opened to the public from the 1990s onward. These include the Le Thiers workshops, the Cutlers’ Center (Cité des Couteliers), the May factory (Usine du May), and the Rouets Valley (Vallée des Rouets), the latter of which has received a two-star rating from the Michelin Green Guide, indicating it is "worth a detour."

== Protection ==
=== Lack of AOC and the PGI project ===
As of 2024, no Appellation d'origine contrôlée (AOC, protected designation of origin) exists for knives manufactured in the Thiers region, despite the area's long-standing cutlery tradition and recognized expertise. Since 2005, an AOC project has been under consideration to protect the production of Laguiole knives. While initially focused solely on the village of Laguiole, the proposal has shifted toward a shared designation with Thiers, as approximately 80% of Laguiole knives produced in France in 2017 originated from Thiers. Thiers cutlery is not currently listed in the French Inventory of Intangible Cultural Heritage.

Since the late 2000s, the French Ministry of Crafts, Trade, and Tourism has been developing a project for a protected geographical indication (PGI) to safeguard the production of Laguiole knives. As of 2012, a PGI specification was in preparation, based on a consensus involving most cutlers from both Thiers and Laguiole. However, the initiative has led to an ongoing dispute between the two towns, including legal proceedings.

The French Federation of Cutlery, an interprofessional organization based in Thiers, supports the creation of a protective label such as "Guaranteed Origin France" to promote and safeguard domestic knife production. In 2005, the mayor of Thiers, who was also an industrialist, expressed skepticism about this approach, characterizing it as a rearguard action. He advocated instead for a focus on innovation, new functionalities, and niche markets.

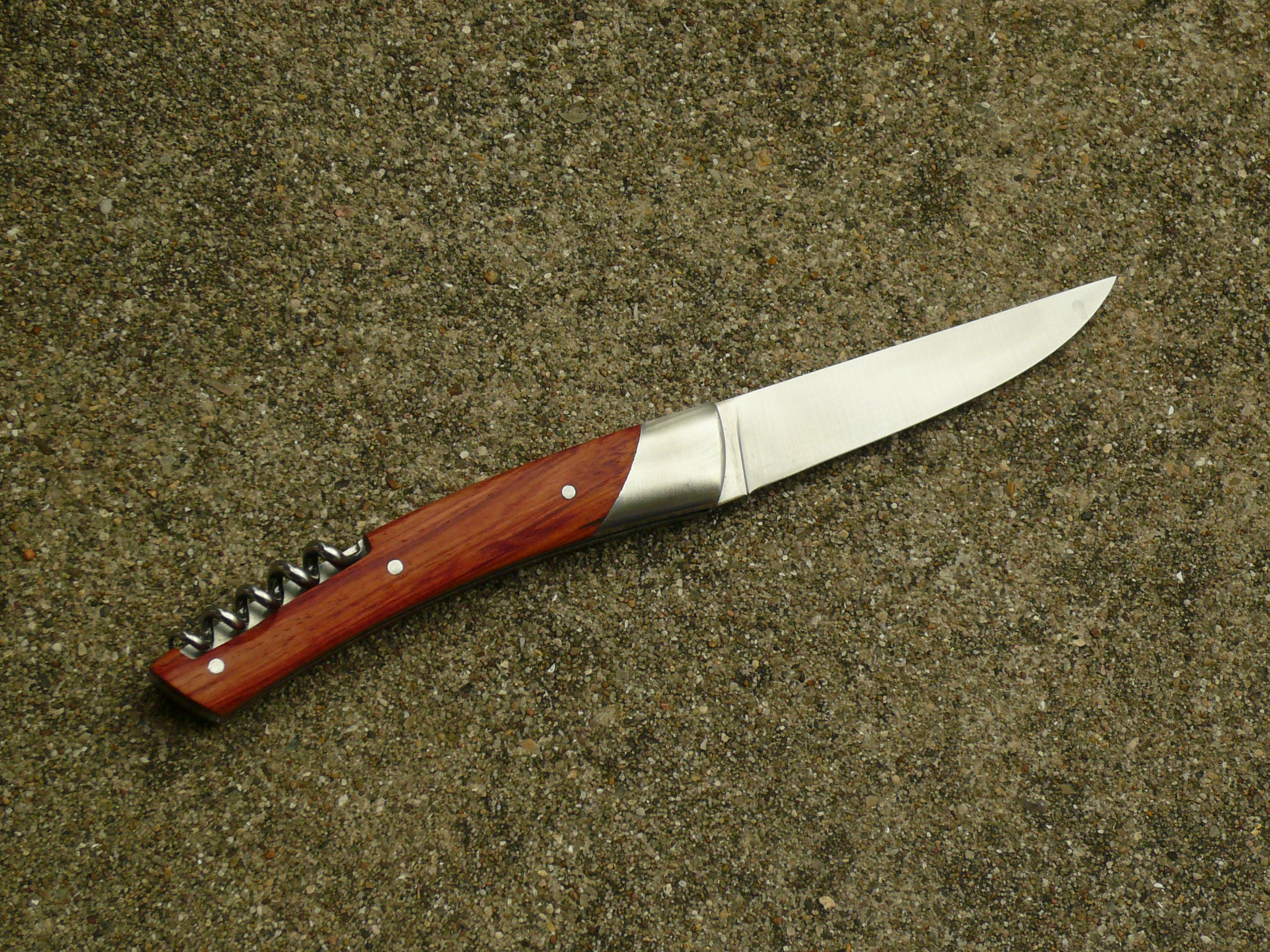
A rosewood Thiers knife with a corkscrew on the handle.

=== Creation of the Le Thiers knife ===
The history of the Le Thiers knife dates back to 1993, when the Confrérie du Couté de Tié was established to promote the Thiers knife. From the outset, the knife was intended to be interpreted by individual manufacturers and incorporated into their product lines while adhering to specific standards overseen by the guild. Although regulated, the design allows for a degree of personal creativity among Thiers cutlers. The official launch of the knife's marketing took place in early 1995, although some Le Thiers models had already appeared in regional cutlery catalogs by November 1994.

== See also ==
- Thiers, Puy-de-Dôme
- Durolle
- Vallée des Usines
- Cutlery Museum
- Vallée des Rouets

== Bibliography ==
- Gribet, Octave (2021). La coutellerie de Thiers durant la Première Guerre mondiale [Thiers cutlery during the First World War] (in French). Clermont-Ferrand: Université Clermont Auvergne.
