= Le Monestier =

- Commune
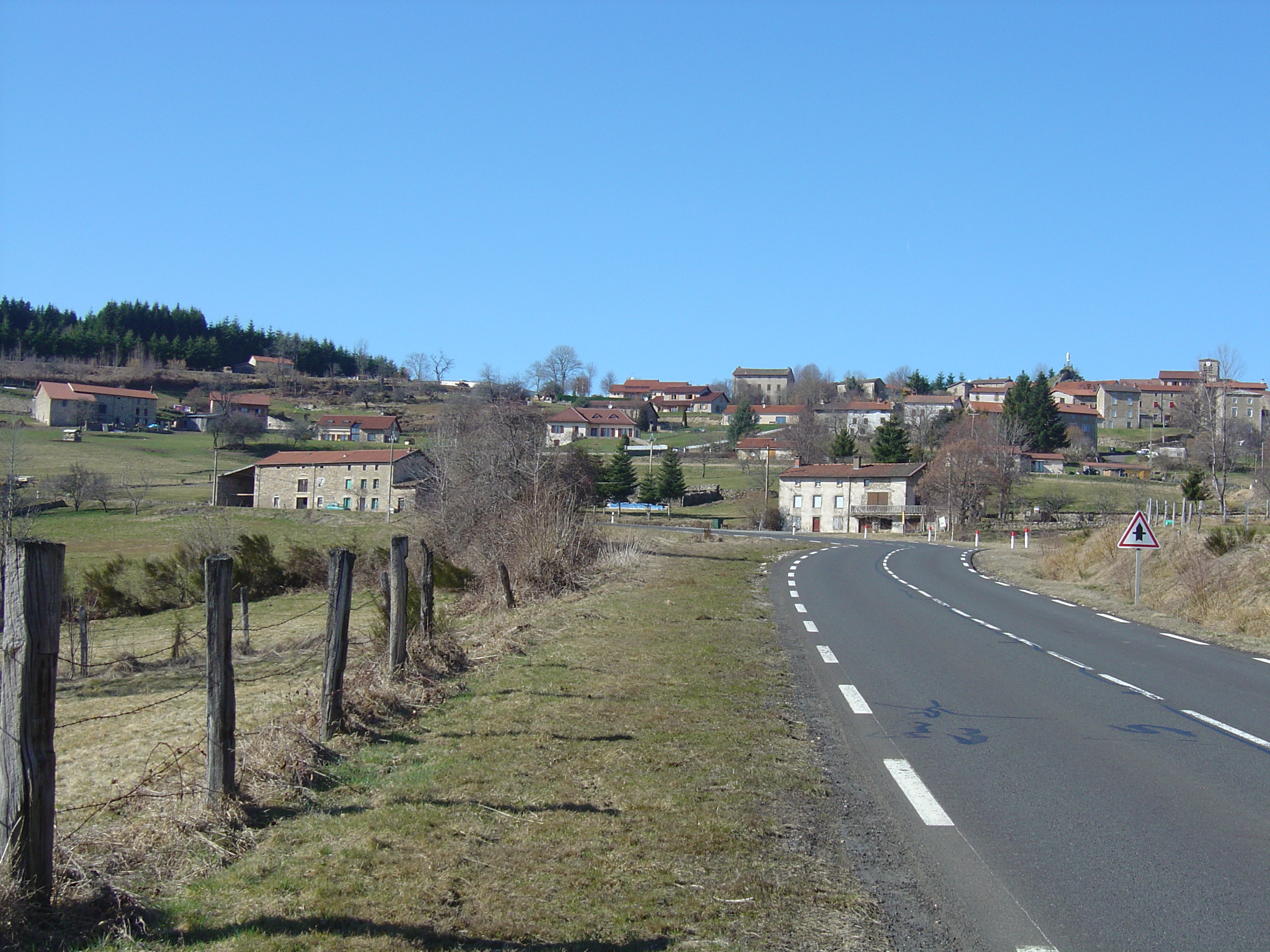
- A general view of Le Monestier
- Location of Le Monestier
- Location within France Location within Auvergne-Rhône-Alpes
- Coordinates: 45°33′50″N 3°39′46″E
- Country: France
- Region: Auvergne-Rhône-Alpes
- Department: Puy-de-Dôme
- Arrondissement: Ambert
- Canton: Les Monts du Livradois
- Intercommunality: Ambert Livradois Forez

Government
  - Mayor (2026–32): Didier Lack
- Area^{1}: 17.31 km^{2} (6.68 sq mi)
- Highest elevation: 1,215 m (3,986 ft)
- Lowest elevation: 753 m (2,470 ft)
- Population (2023): 242
  - Density: 14.0/km^{2} (36.2/sq mi)
- Time zone: UTC+01:00 (CET)
  - Summer (DST): UTC+02:00 (CEST)
- INSEE/Postal code: 63230 /63890
- ^{1} French Land Register data, which excludes lakes, ponds, glaciers > 1 km^{2} (0.386 sq mi or 247 acres) and river estuaries.

Le Monestier (French pronunciation: [lə mɔnɛstje]) is a commune in the Puy-de-Dôme department in Auvergne in central France.

== Geography ==
Le Monestier is a rural commune in Auvergne, located in the Livradois-Forez Regional Natural Park. Its altitude reaches 1,215 meters at Bois Noirs, the highest point of the Livradois.

== See also ==
- Communes of the Puy-de-Dôme department
