= Cutlery Museum =

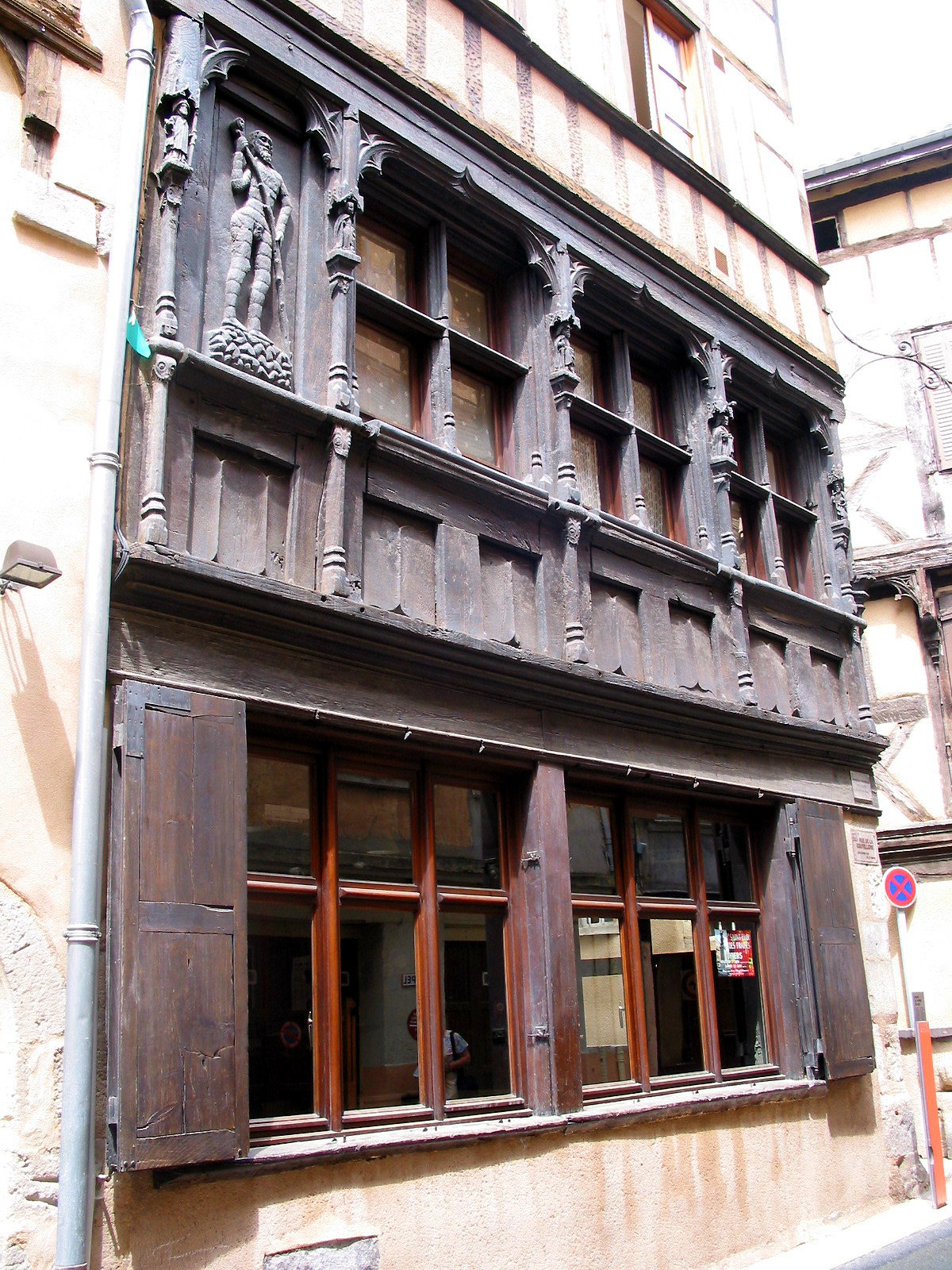
- North facade, house called "the man of the woods"

- Location within France
- Established: 1982
- Location: 63 300 Thiers, France
- Coordinates: 45°51′13″N 3°32′51″E
- Type: Museum, historic site
- Visitors: 30,000 (2016)
- Curator: City of Thiers

The Cutlery Museum is a museum located in Thiers in France in the department of Puy-de-Dôme.

== History ==
The museum has been open since 1982 to preserve the heritage of the Thiers cutlery industry.

== Description ==
The Cutlery Museum consists of three separate buildings within the city center and in a village nearby. The first is located in the former "House of the Consuls" (a registered historic monument since 1983) and is dedicated to the history of the cutlery industry. In an adjacent building, there are demonstrations of the manufacturing of knives as well as an exhibition of artistic knives. The third building, located in the nearby village of Château-Gaillard, has a knife sharpening demonstration by Georges Lyonnet. Being the last, traditionally skilled sharpener, Mr. Lyonnet demonstrates his technique on his still-functioning, traditional sharpening wheel that he was the last worker assigned to use.

== Gallery ==
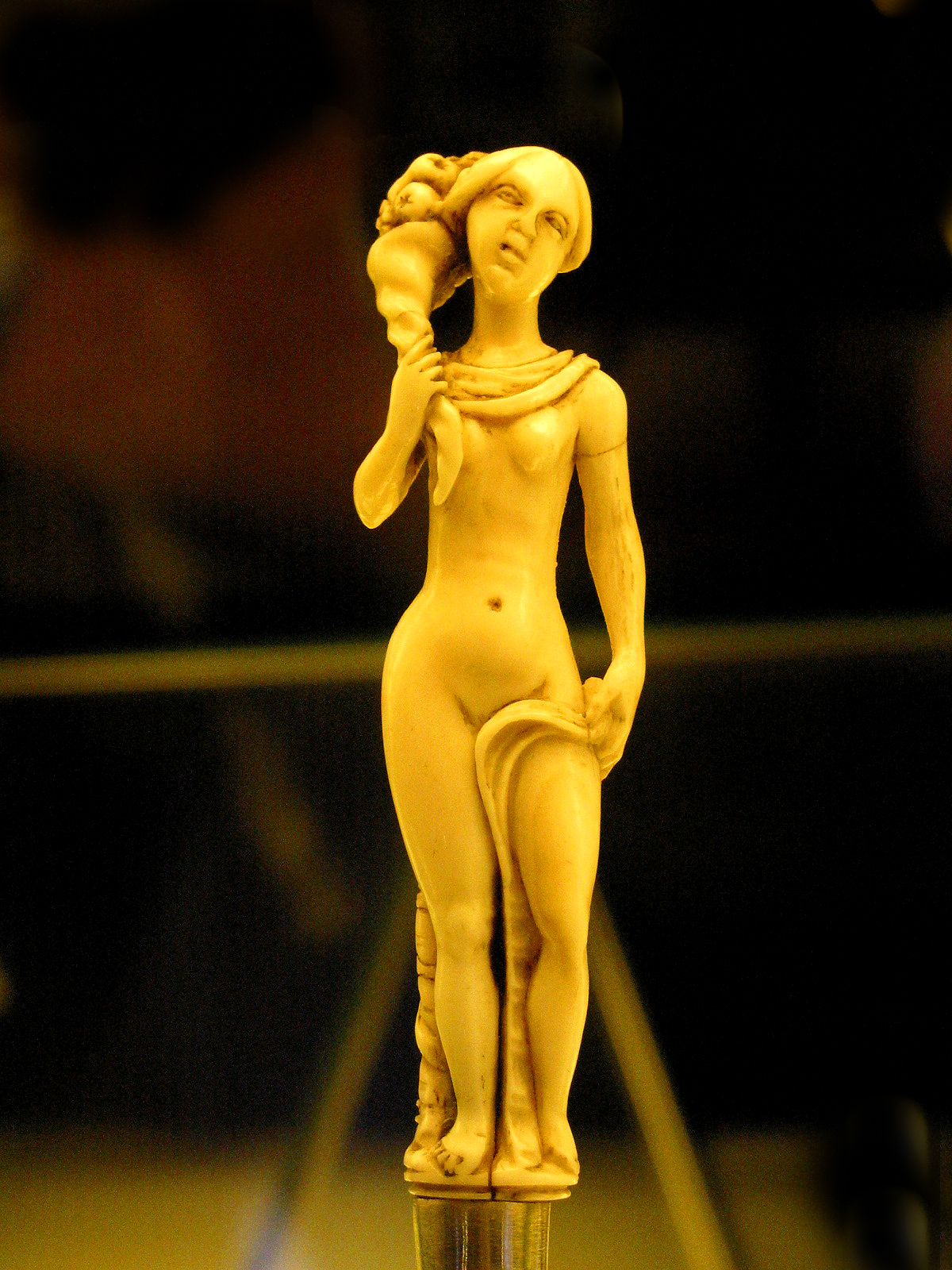

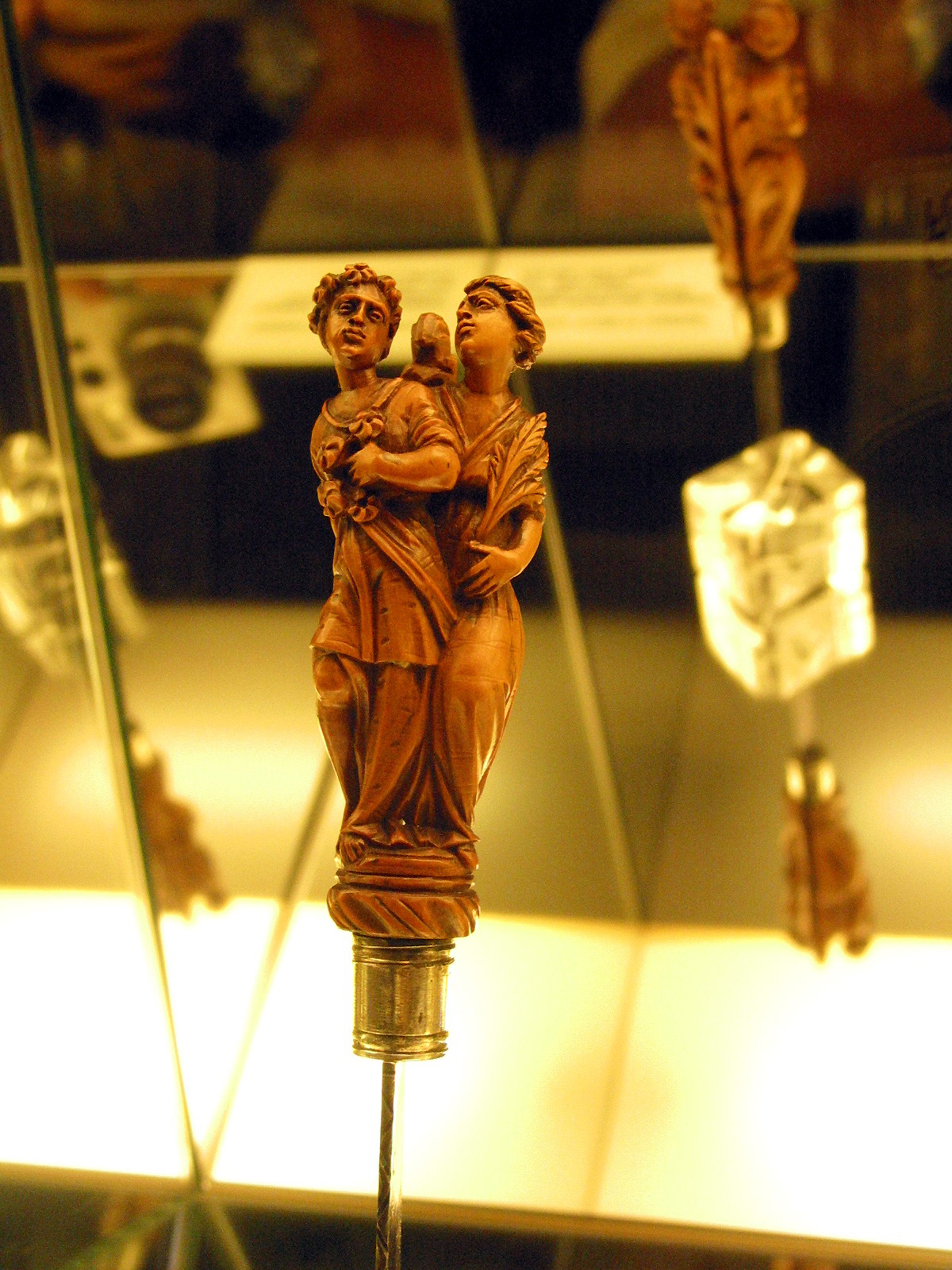

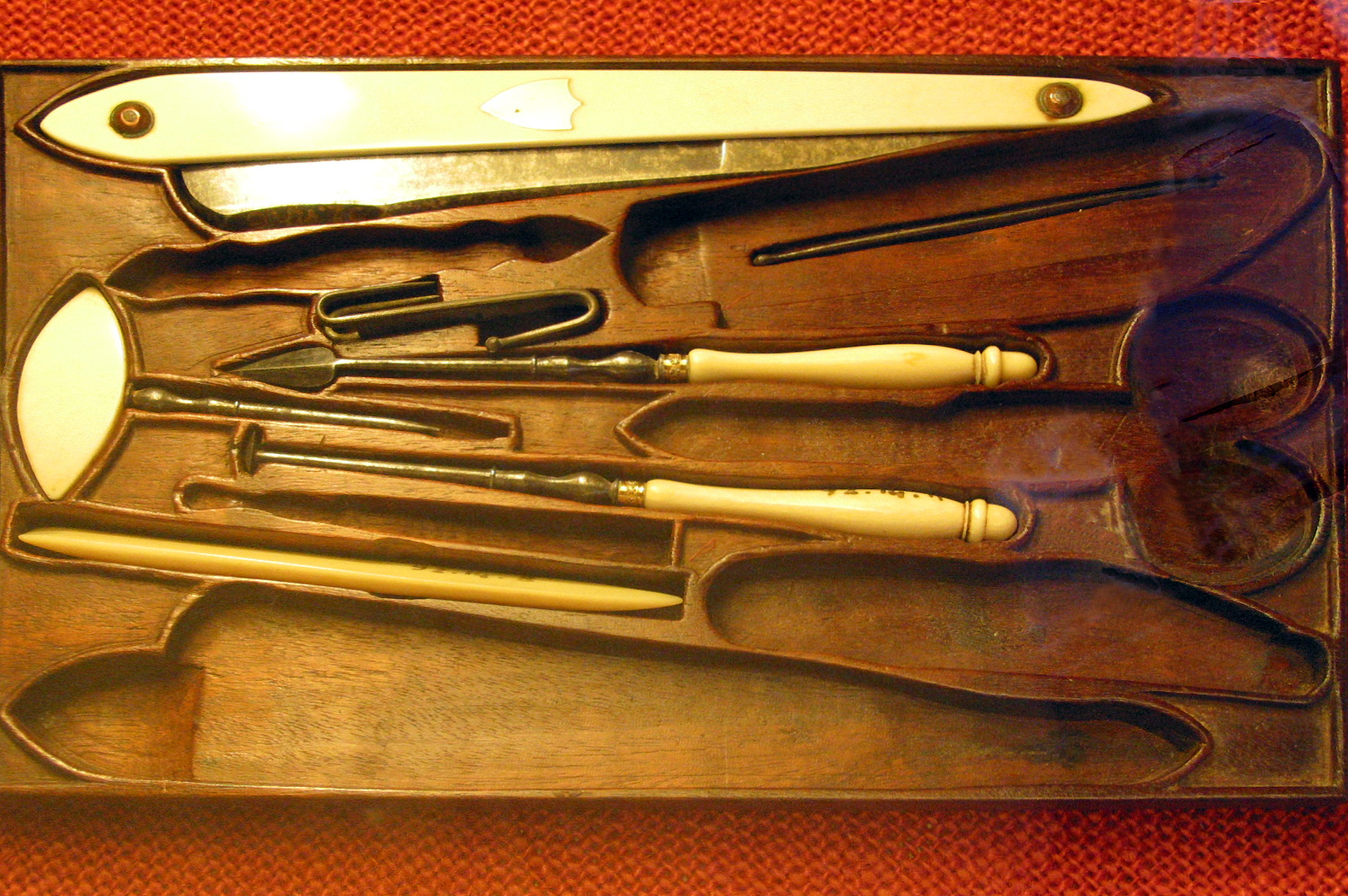

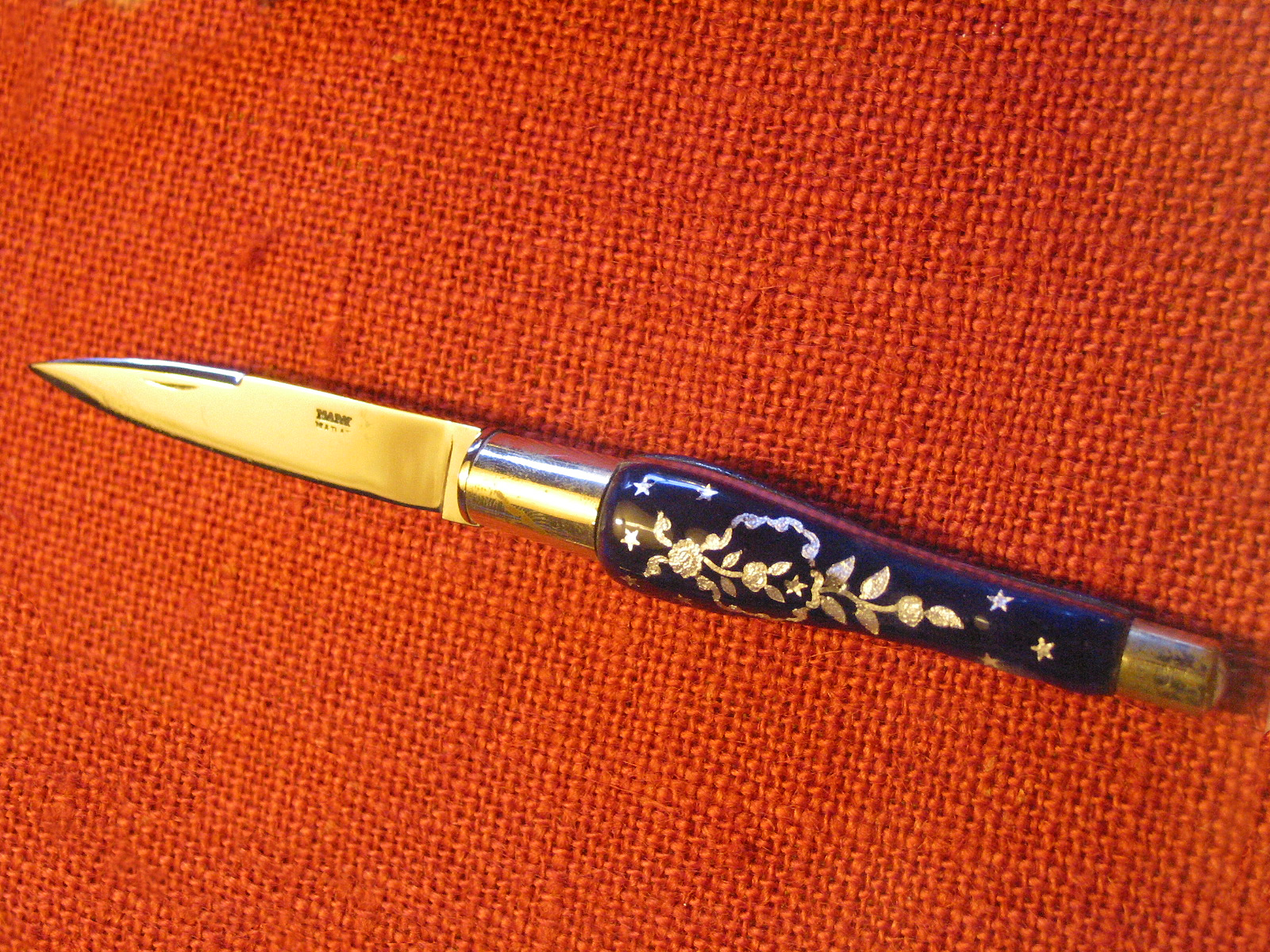

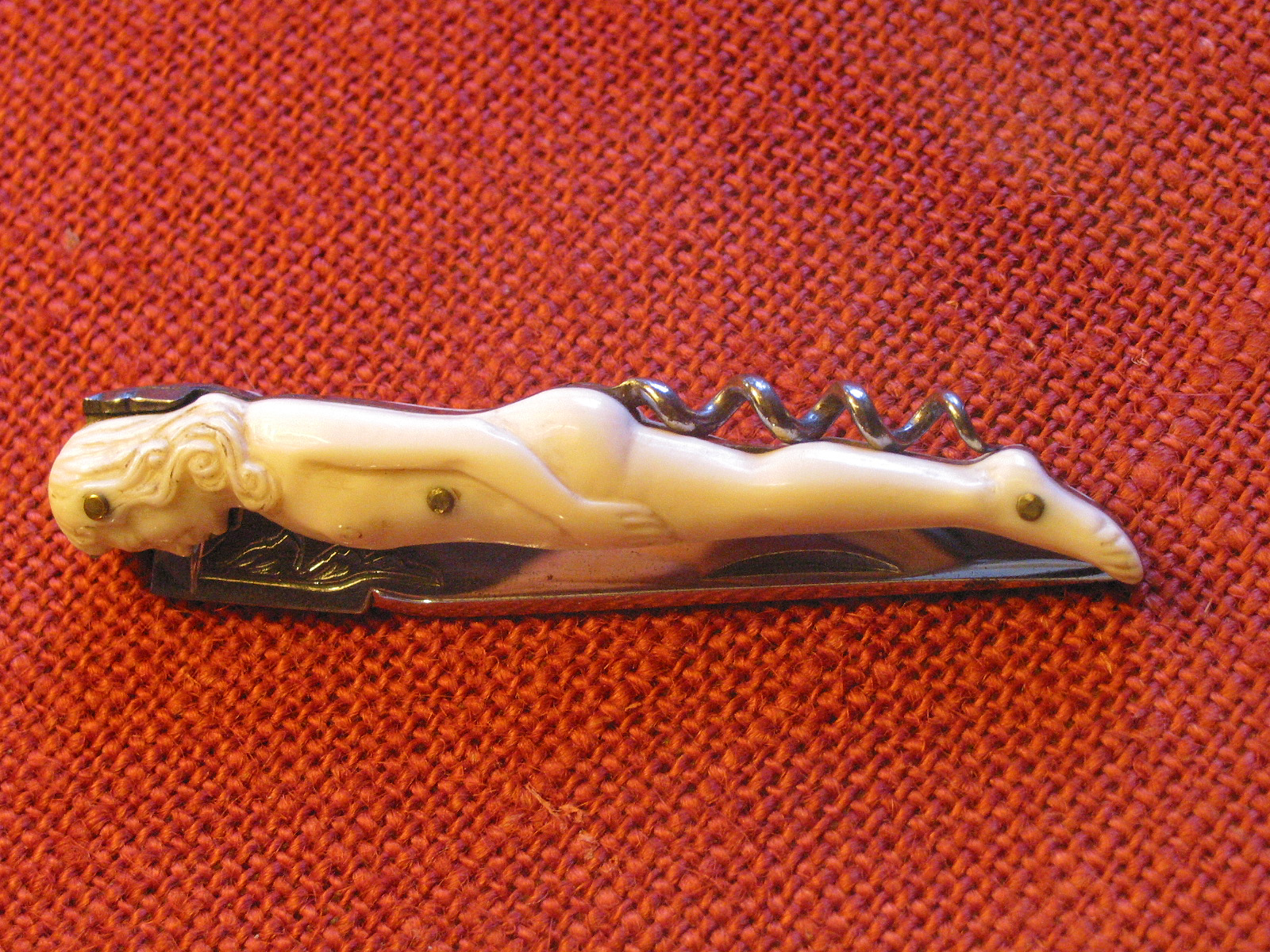

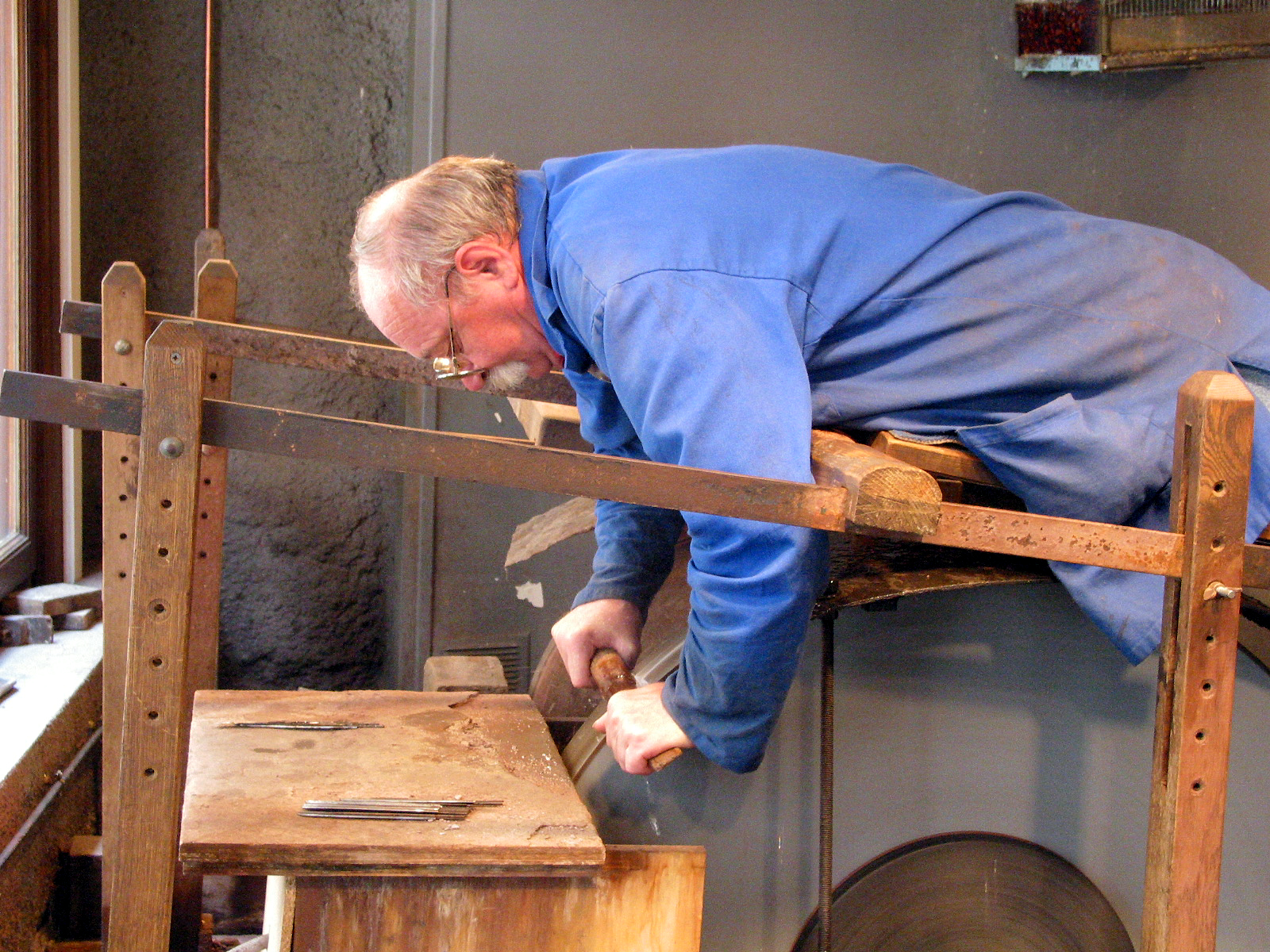

== See also ==
- Thiers, Puy-de-Dôme
- Durolle
- Cutlery of Thiers
