= Livradois =

French mountain region

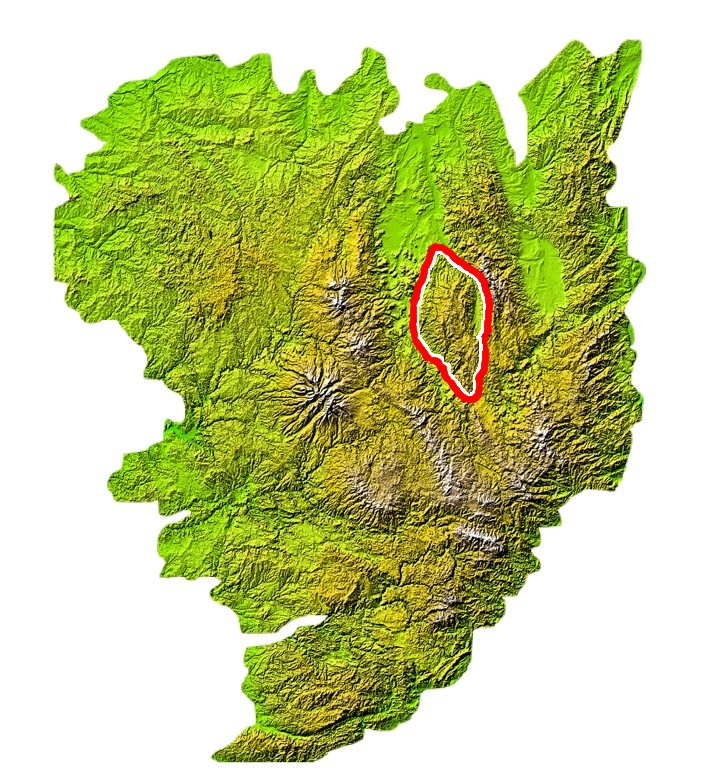
- Location map of Livradois in the Massif Central.

Highest point
- Elevation: 1,215 m (3,986 ft) at Bois Noirs

Geography
- Location: Auvergne-Rhône-Alpes, France
- Parent range: Massif Central

The Livradois (French pronunciation: [livʁadwa]) is a natural region in France located in the center of the Massif Central, within the departments of Puy-de-Dôme and Haute-Loire. It consists of a mountainous massif, the Livradois mountains, and a plain, the Livradois plain. Together, they form a coherent and recognized human, cultural, and economic entity, though they do not constitute a specific political entity. The Livradois is part of the Livradois-Forez Regional Natural Park.

The name of this natural region is Liuradés in the Occitan language.

== Geology ==
The Livradois is an ancient massif from the Hercynian period, composed of granitic rocks and granulites in the north, and gneiss and mica schists in the south.

== Regional Natural Park ==
The Livradois mountains are part of the Livradois-Forez Regional Natural Park. Indeed, as early as the 1960s, the idea emerged to create a national park modeled after the Cévennes National Park. To achieve a sufficient size, it was suggested to combine the Livradois mountains with those of Forez. The park was officially created in 1986 and includes 162 communes.
