= Le Thiers =

Model of knife manufactured in Thiers, Puy-de-Dôme, France

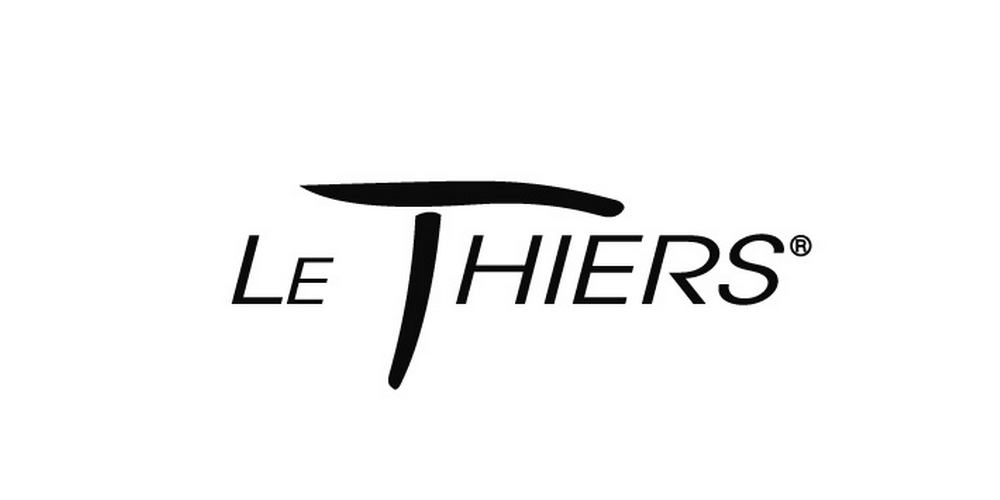
- Product type: Knives and cutlery items
- Current owner: Association Le Couté de Tié
- Country: France
- Introduced: 1993
- Website: lethiers.fr

Le Thiers is a collective trademark for a model of knife manufactured in Thiers, located in the Puy-de-Dôme department of the Auvergne-Rhône-Alpes region in France. The knife is characterized by a distinctive double-wave handle design, with the slopes at both ends of the handle inverted. The trademark, owned by the association Le Couté de Tié, is registered with the Institut national de la propriété industrielle (INPI).

== Pronunciation ==
In contemporary French, the name is pronounced as "Tièr," but historically, it was pronounced "Tié," derived from the Auvergnat pronunciation. The name originates from the Auvergnat phrase "couté de Tié" (unified Auvergnat orthography / phonetics) or, in its full form, "Le coutê de Tié." In the classical Occitan orthography, it is written as "cotèl de Tièrn."

== Origin ==
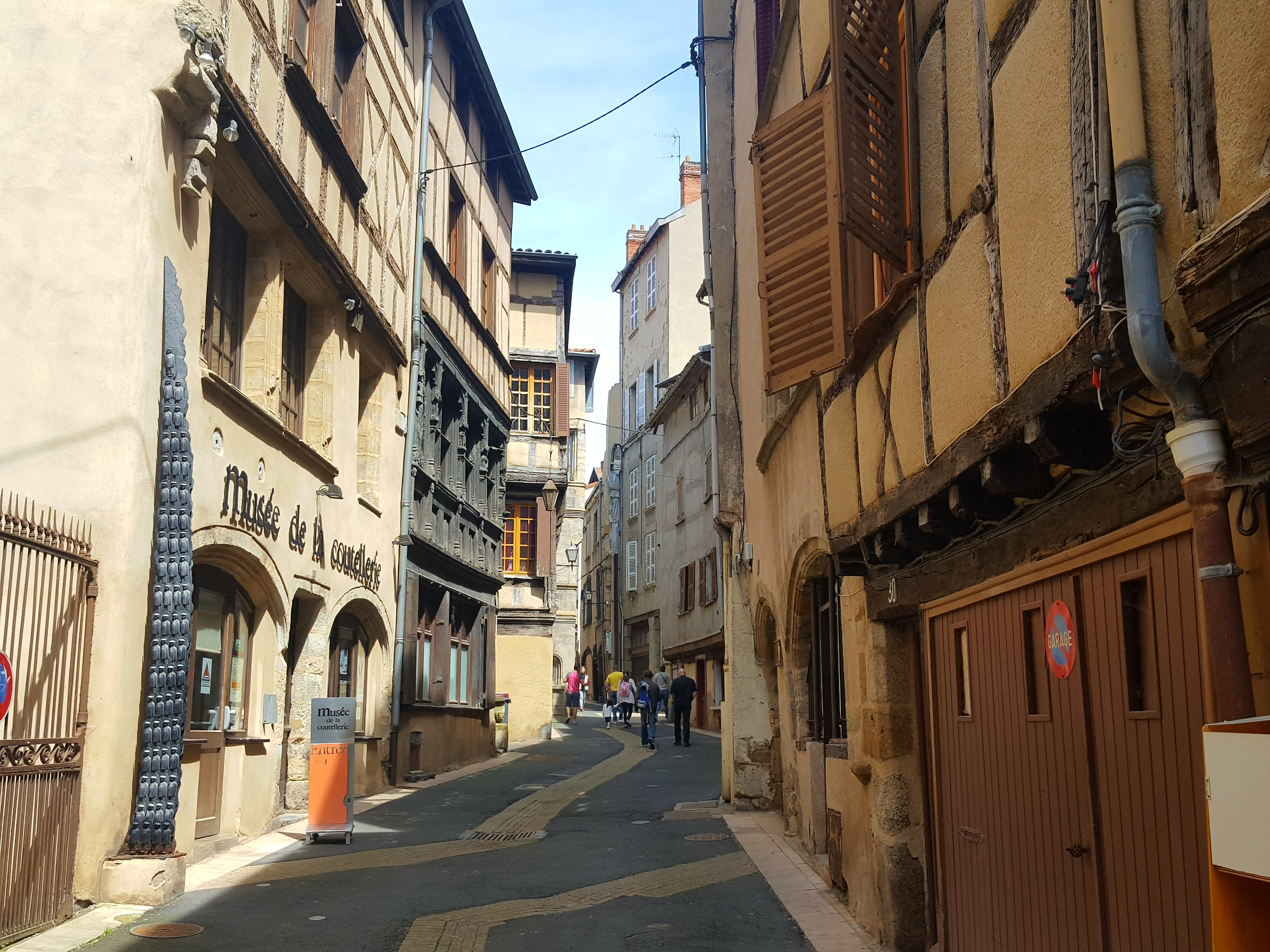
Rue de la Coutellerie in Thiers.

The history of the Le Thiers knife likely began in 1993 with the founding of the Confrérie du Couteau Le Thiers. The primary goal of this brotherhood was to promote the Thiers knife. According to Roland Bouquet, director of the Thiers Chamber of Commerce and Industry, the challenges facing the cutlery industry should not be reduced to issues surrounding the Laguiole knife, which has been heavily impacted by counterfeiting. From 1994, the Le Thiers knife was designed to be adapted by various manufacturers for inclusion in their catalogs, adhering to specific standards regulated by a jurande (guild-like oversight body), while still allowing significant creative freedom for Thiers cutlers. Commercialization of the knife was announced in early 1995, though some Le Thiers knives had already appeared in local cutlers’ shops by November 1994.

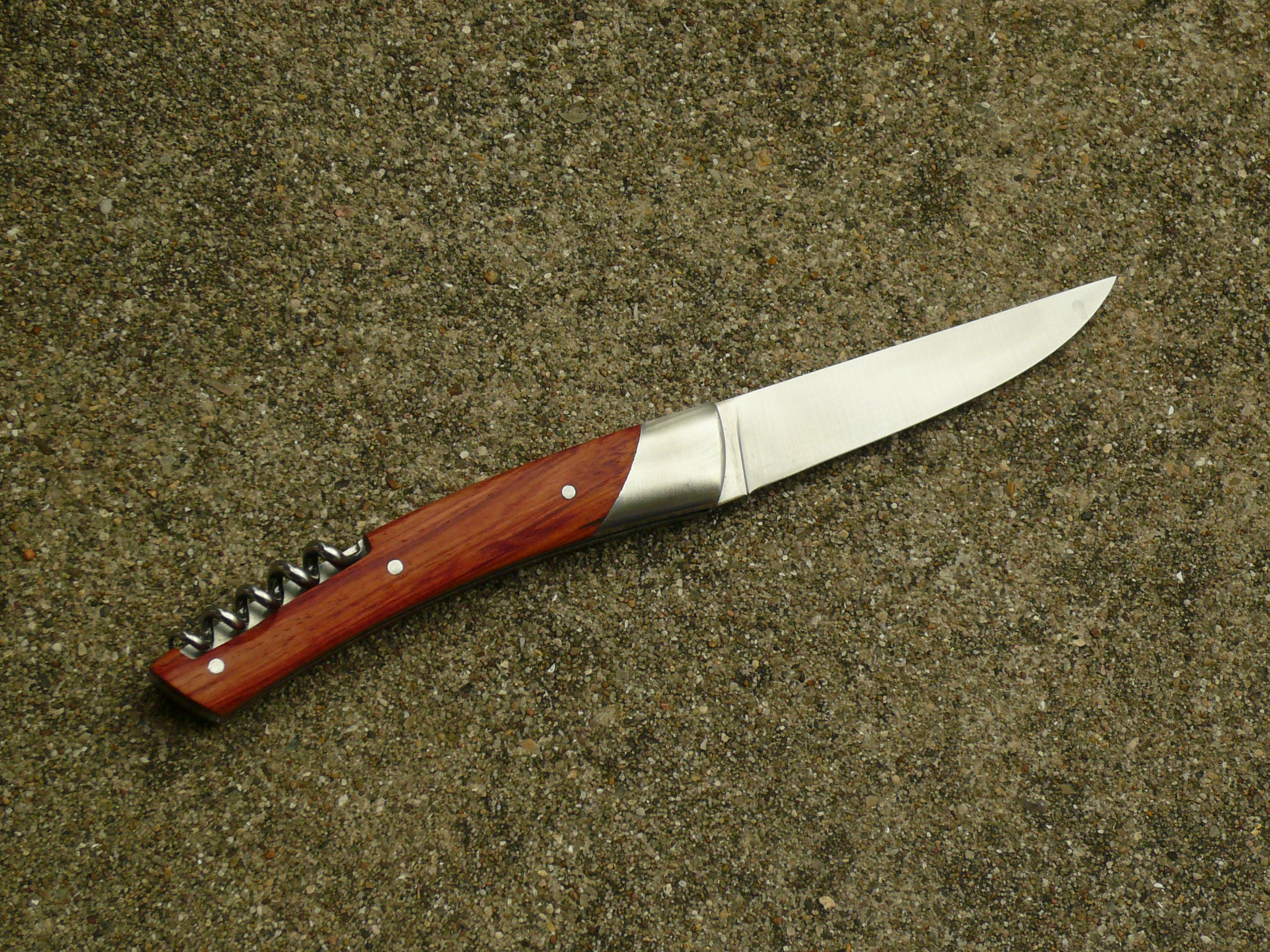
A Le Thiers knife with corkscrew.

In 2007, 40 manufacturers produced the Le Thiers knife. By 2017, this number had grown to 51 manufacturers, alongside 14 artisan cutlers and self-employed craftsmen. The knife is now produced not only in Thiers but also in nearby areas such as Celles-sur-Durolle and Saint-Rémy-sur-Durolle, known as the world capital of corkscrew manufacturing.

== Significance in Thiers society ==
Over the years, the Le Thiers knife has become an emblem of the city of Thiers. The Confrérie du Couteau Le Thiers remains highly active, attracting an increasing number of cutlers and artisans from the Thiers region. Events such as Coutellia, an international cutlery festival, prominently feature the Le Thiers knife, with the festival's official poster often showcasing its design. The Thiers cutlery industry draws artisans and visitors from around the globe to participate in various events where the Le Thiers knife is a central focus.

== See also ==
- Thiers
- Cutlery
- Knife
- Opinel
- Laguiole knife

== Bibliography ==
- Terres Éditions (2013). L'encyclopédie illustrée des couteaux, poignards & baïonnettes [The Illustrated Encyclopedia of Knives, Daggers & Bayonets] (in French). Sayat: Éd Terres. p. 256. ISBN 978-2-35530-184-1.
- Hartink, A. E. (2013). Encyclopédie des couteaux [Encyclopedia of Knives] (in French). Riom (Puy-de-Dôme): Terres éditions. p. 352. ISBN 978-2-35530-159-9.
- Le Thiers : Secrets de fabrication [Le Thiers: Manufacturing secrets] (in French). Camille éditions. 1998. p. 125. ISBN 978-2913028005.
- Prival, Marc; Morel, David; Sablonnière, Michel; Therre, Georges (2015). L'art du coutelier à Thiers et dans sa région : une histoire des techniques et des sociétés humaines [The art of knife-making in Thiers and its region: a history of techniques and human societies] (in French). Ed. des Monts d'Auvergne. p. 355. ISBN 9782366540451.
- Vasset, Michel; Blanchon, Laurent (2011). Thiers: Ateliers d'artisans couteliers [Thiers: Workshops of artisan knife makers] (in French). Page centrale. p. 128. ISBN 979-1090367005.
- "Livres sur la coutellerie" [Books on Cutlery]. couteaux-jfl.com. Archived from the original on 6 February 2004.
