= Pierre Jean-Baptiste Legrand d'Aussy =

French antiquarian and historian (1737-1800)

Pierre Jean-Baptiste Legrand d'Aussy (3 June 1737 – 6 December 1800) was a French antiquarian and historian, who introduced the terms menhir and dolmen, both taken from the Breton language, into antiquarian terminology. He interpreted megaliths as gallic tombs.

Born at Amiens, the son of an employee of the general tax farm, the Ferme générale, he received his education from the Jesuits, was admitted to their order and served as professor of rhetoric at Caen. After the suppression of the Jesuits in 1762-63, he returned to Paris, where Jean-Baptiste de La Curne de Sainte-Palaye took him on as a research associate for his Glossaire français, and the marquis de Paulmy entrusted to him the editing of the Mélanges drawn from his private library.

In 1770 Legrand was named secretary to the directors of the École Militaire. Somewhat later, he served as private tutor to the son of a fermier général. One of his brothers having been named abbot of Saint-André de Clermont, Legrand went to pay him a visit, and ranged through Auvergne as a naturalist, in 1787 and 1788. A result was the Voyage dans la haute et basse Auvergne (Paris, 1788).

With the Revolution, in 1795 Legrand was named conservator of French manuscripts in the Bibliothèque nationale. He took up once again an earlier project of writing a complete history of French poetry. Having translated the Old French into modern French and published a large number of analyses of old French poets in the Notices des Manuscrits de la Bibliothèque du Roi, he enlarged his frame of reference, but have completed only some parts of his great work, when he died suddenly, in Paris, 6 December 1800.

Legrand was a member of the Institut de France.

== Publications ==
- Fabliaux ou Contes des douzième et treizième siècles, traduits ou extraits d’après les manuscrits, Paris, 1779, 3 vol. in-8°; a fourth volume, Contes dévots, Fables et Romans anciens, 1781, in-8°; new edition, Paris, 1781, 1 vol. in-12.
- Histoire de la vie privée des Français depuis l’origine de la nation jusqu’à nos jours; Paris, 1783, 3 vol. in-8°.
- Voyage dans la haute et basse Auvergne, Paris, 1788, in-8°; 1794, 3 vol. in-8°
- Vie d'Appollonius de Thyane, Paris, 1807, 2 vol. in-8°.
- Notice sur l’état de la Marine en France au commencement du quatorzième siècle Mémoires de l’Institut;
- Mémoire sur les anciennes Sépultures nationales, Mémoires de l’Institut;
- Mémoire sur l'ancienne Législation de la France, comprenant la loi salique, la loi des Visigoths, la loi des Bourguignons, Mémoires de l’Institut .
