= Bois Noirs (Livradois) =

Mountain in central France

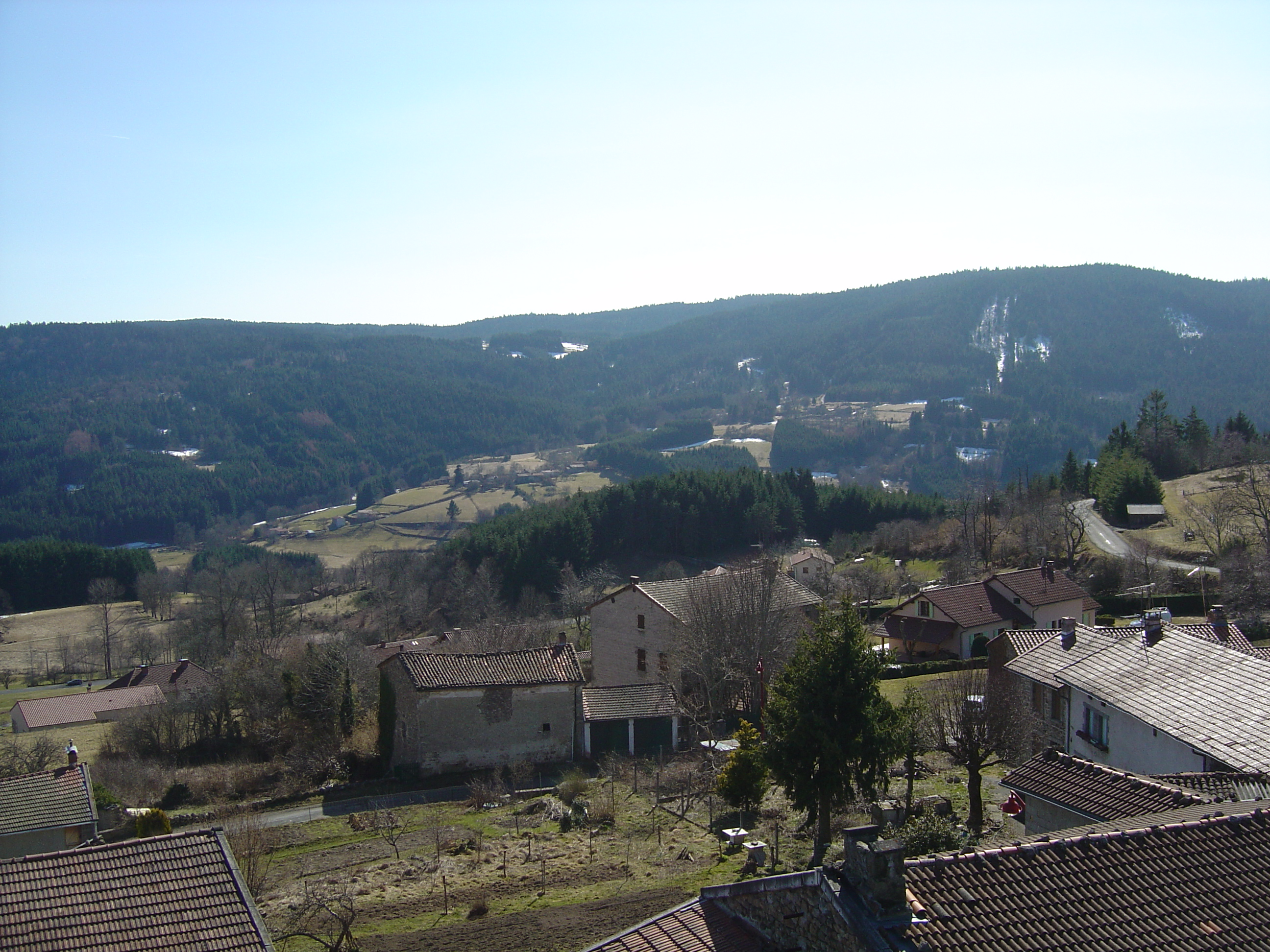
- Bois Noirs Forest, with Signal de Mons on the right, viewed from the Rocher de la Vierge overlooking the village of Le Monestier, about 3 km away as the crow flies.

Highest point
- Elevation: 1,215 m (3,986 ft)
- Coordinates: 45°31′54″N 3°38′09″E

Geography
- Location within France
- Location: Puy-de-Dôme departement, France
- Parent range: Livradois (Massif Central)

The Bois Noirs (French pronunciation: [bwa nwaʁ], lit. 'Black Woods') Forest is the highest point of the Livradois mountains, at an altitude of 1,215 meters. The absolute summit of the massif is also called Signal de Mons.

Located in the Livradois-Forez Regional Natural Park and in the Puy-de-Dôme department, its summit, in the heart of a coniferous forest, does not allow for a panoramic view of the regional natural park.
